= Arthur Forbes =

Arthur Forbes may refer to:

- Arthur Forbes, 5th Lord Forbes (died 1493), Lord Forbes
- Arthur Forbes, 9th Lord Forbes (1581–1641), Lord Forbes
- Arthur Forbes, 1st Earl of Granard (1623–1696), Irish soldier
- Sir Arthur Forbes, 1st Baronet (c. 1590–1632)
- Arthur Forbes, 9th Earl of Granard (1915–1992), British peer
- Arthur Forbes Gordon Kilby (1885–1915), English recipient of the Victoria Cross
- Arthur Forbes, 2nd Earl of Granard (c. 1656–1734), Earl of Granard
- Sir Arthur Forbes, 4th Baronet (1709–1773), British Member of Parliament for Aberdeenshire
- Sir Arthur Forbes, 6th Baronet (1784–1823), of the Forbes baronets
- Arthur Forbes (Royal Navy officer) (died 1891), British admiral
- Arthur C. Forbes (1866–1950), English forestry expert
