= Earl of Granard =

Title in the peerage of Ireland

- Arms: Azure three Bears' Heads couped Argent muzzled Gules.
- Creation date: 30 December 1684
- Created by: Charles II
- Peerage: Peerage of Ireland
- First holder: Arthur Forbes, 1st Earl of Granard
- Present holder: Peter Arthur Edward Hastings Forbes, 10th Earl of Granard
- Heir apparent: Jonathan Peter Hastings Forbes, Viscount Forbes
- Remainder to: the 1st Earl's heirs male of the body lawfully begotten.
- Subsidiary titles: Viscount Granard; Baron Clanehugh; Baron Granard; Baronet, of Castle Forbes
- Status: Extant
- Seat: Castle Forbes
- Motto: FAX MENTIS INCENDIUM GLORIAE (The incitement to glory is the firebrand of the mind)

Earl of Granard is a title in the Peerage of Ireland. It was created in 1684 for Arthur Forbes, 1st Viscount Granard. He was a lieutenant-general in the army and served as Marshal of the Army in Ireland after the Restoration and was later Lord Justice of Ireland. He had already succeeded his father as second Baronet of Castle Forbes and been created Baron Clanehugh and Viscount Granard in 1675, also in the Peerage of Ireland. The baronetcy, of Castle Forbes in County Longford, was created in the Baronetage of Nova Scotia on 29 September 1628 for his father, Arthur Forbes, a direct descendant of Patrick Forbes of Corsse, a younger son of James Forbes, 2nd Lord Forbes (died 1476).

The first Earl's grandson, the third Earl, was an admiral in the Royal Navy. He was summoned to the Irish House of Lords through a writ of acceleration as Lord Forbes in his father's lifetime. He was succeeded by his son, the fourth Earl. He was a lieutenant-general in the Army. His grandson, the sixth Earl, was a general in the Army. In 1806 he was created Baron Granard, of Castle Donington in the County of Leicester, in the Peerage of the United Kingdom. This title gave the Earls an automatic seat in the House of Lords until the passing of the House of Lords Act 1999. On his death the titles passed to his grandson, the seventh Earl. He notably served as Lord Lieutenant of County Leitrim from 1856 to 1872. His son, the eighth Earl, was a soldier and Liberal politician. Lord Granard held junior office in the Liberal administrations of Sir Henry Campbell-Bannerman and H. H. Asquith and was also a member of the Senate of Southern Ireland and of the Senate of the Irish Free State. As of 2014 the titles are held by his grandson, the tenth Earl, who succeeded his uncle in 1992.

The invented title of Viscount Forbes is used as a courtesy title for the Earl's heir apparent.

The family seat is Castle Forbes, near Newtownforbes, County Longford.

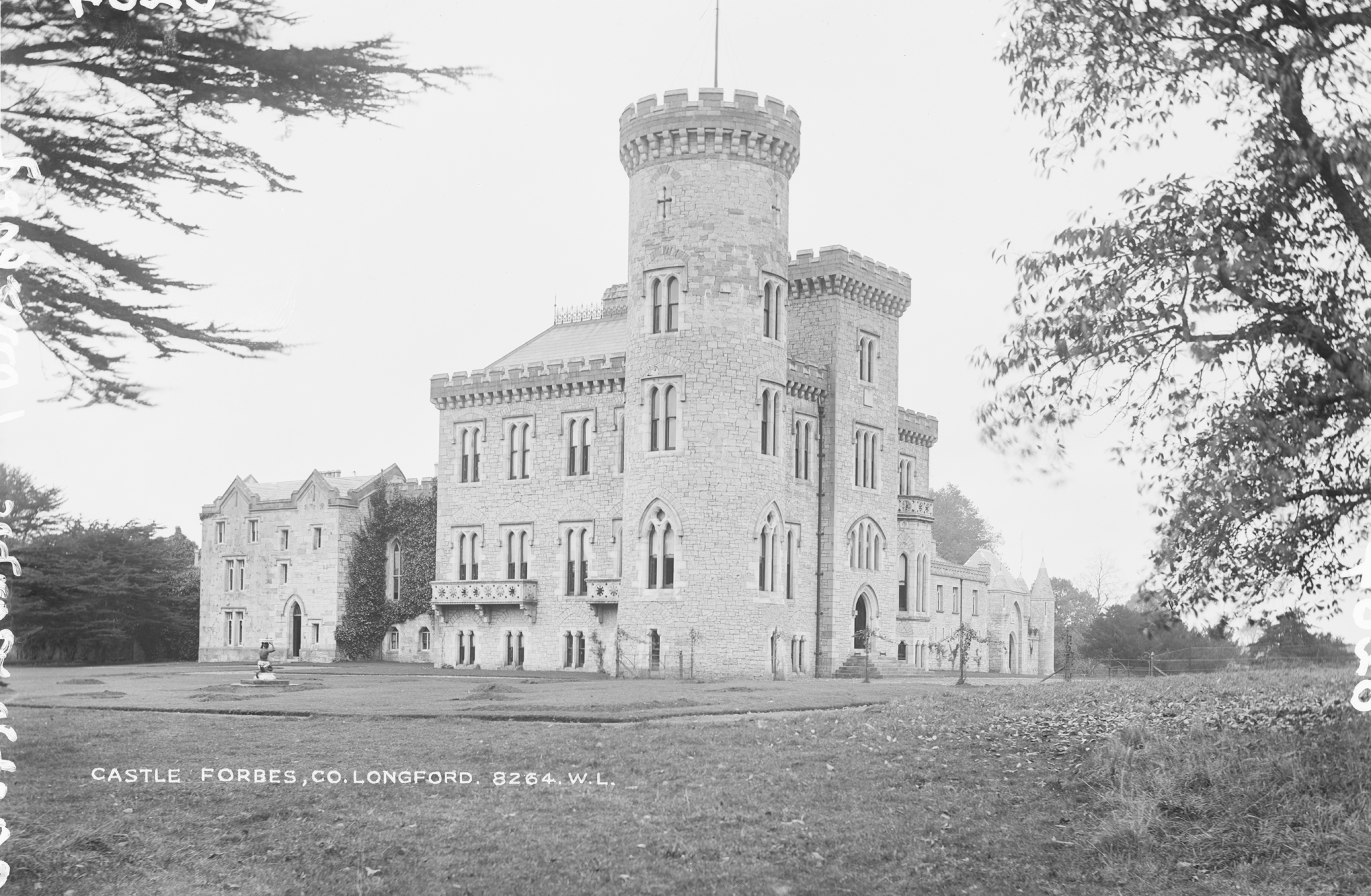
An image of Castle Forbes, County Longford circa 1900.

== Forbes baronets, of Castle Forbes (1628) ==
- Sir Arthur Forbes, 1st Baronet (died 1632)
- Sir Arthur Forbes, 2nd Baronet (1623–1695) (created Baron Clanehugh and Viscount Granard in 1675)

=== Viscount Granard (1675) ===
- Sir Arthur Forbes, 1st Viscount Granard (1623–1695) (created Earl of Granard in 1684)

=== Earl of Granard (1684) ===
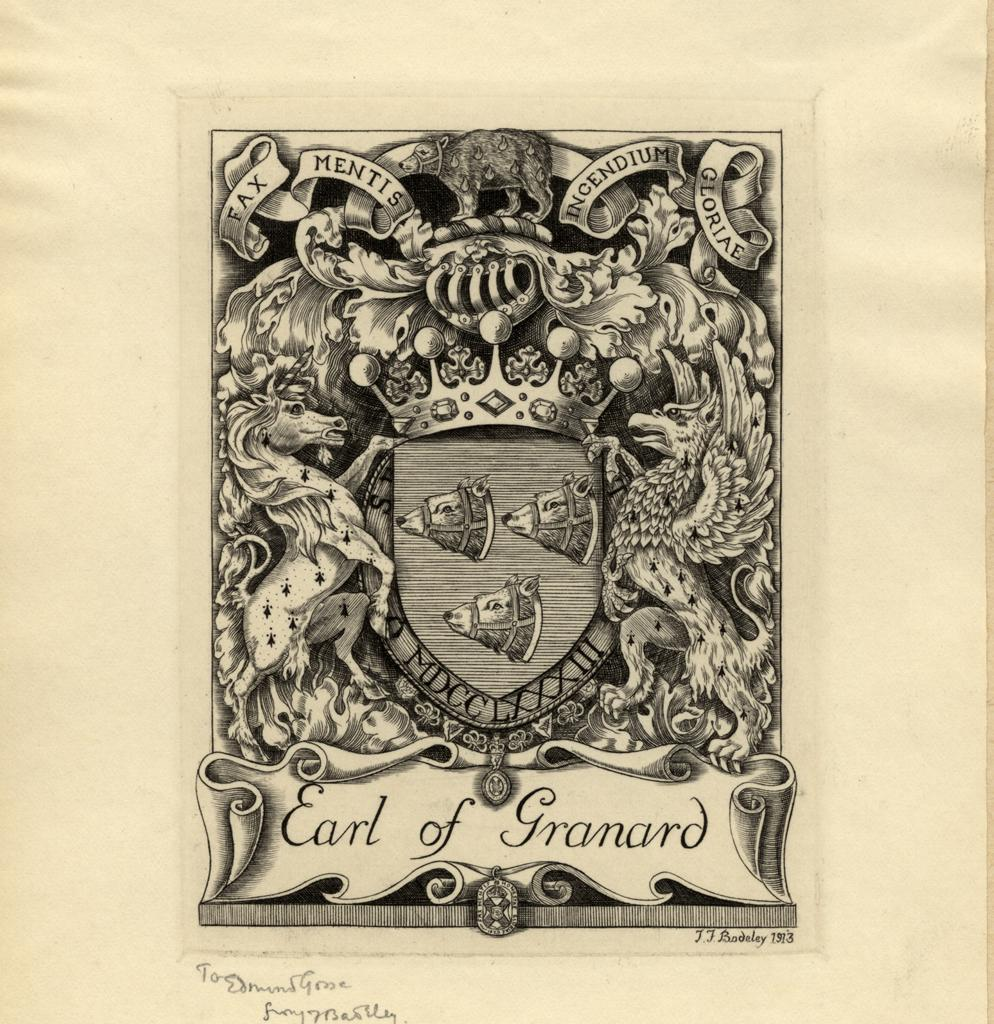
Bookplate by Henry Badeley showing the coat of arms and motto of Forbes, Earl of Granard

- Arthur Forbes, 1st Earl of Granard (1623–1695)
- Arthur Forbes, 2nd Earl of Granard (c. 1656 – 1734)
- George Forbes, 3rd Earl of Granard (1685–1765)
- George Forbes, 4th Earl of Granard (1710–1769)
- George Forbes, 5th Earl of Granard (1740–1780)
- George Forbes, 6th Earl of Granard (1760–1837) (created Baron Granard in 1806)
  - George Forbes, Viscount Forbes (1785–1836)
- George Arthur Hastings Forbes, 7th Earl of Granard (1833–1889)
- Bernard Arthur William Patrick Hastings Forbes, 8th Earl of Granard (1874–1948)
- Arthur Patrick Hastings Forbes, 9th Earl of Granard (1915–1992)
- Peter Arthur Edward Hastings Forbes, 10th Earl of Granard (born 1957)

The heir apparent is the present holder's son, Jonathan Peter Hastings Forbes, Viscount Forbes (born 1981).

== Family tree ==
Forbes family tree

John de Forbes
Lord Forbes, c. 1444
Alexander Forbes c. 1380–1448; 1st Lord Forbes c. 1444–1448
James Forbes d. 1462; 2nd Lord Forbes; 1448–c. 1461
William Forbes d. 1483; 3rd Lord Forbes c. 1461–by 1488	Duncan Forbes	Patrick Forbes
Alexander Forbes d. c. 1491; 4th Lord Forbes by 1488–c. 1491	Arthur Forbes d. c. 1496; 5th Lord Forbes c. 1491–c. 1496	John Forbes d. 1547; 6th Lord Forbes c. 1496–1547	Forbes, later Stuart-Forbes, of Monymusk	Forbes, of Castle Forbes
William Forbes; 1513–1593; 7th Lord Forbes; 1547–1593
John Forbes; 1542–1606; First called "Master of Forbes", then 8th Lord Forbes; 1593–1606	William Forbes of Corse Castle d. 1627
Forbes baronets, of Castle Forbes, 1628
William Forbes; 1563–1592	John Forbes; 1570–1606 "(9th) Lord Forbes"; 1606–1606; His brief lordship was disputed and retroactively discounted. (Note: The numbering dispute vacillated over the years and was most recently (As of 2023) settled in 2018.)	Arthur Forbes; 1581–1641; 9th Lord Forbes; 1606–after 1634	John Forbes 8th of Pitsligo d. 1625	William of Craigievar	Arthur Forbes d. 1632; 1st Baronet of Castle Forbes
Lord Forbes of Pitsligo, 1633	Forbes baronets, of Craigievar Castle, in the County of Aberdeen, 1630	Viscount Granard and Baron Clanehugh, 1675; Earl of Granard, 1684
Alexander Forbes; 1600–1672; 10th Lord Forbes after 1634–1672	Anne	Alexander Forbes d. 1636; 1st Lord Forbes of Pitsligo; 1633–1636	William Forbes, 1st Baronet d. 1648; 1st Baronet of Craigievar and Fintray; 1630–1648	Arthur Forbes; 1623–1695; 1st Earl of Granard, etc., 2nd Baronet of Castle Forbes
William Forbes d. 1697; 11th Lord Forbes after 1672–1697	John Forbes of Moneymusk d. c. 1713; 3rd Baronet of Monymusk	Alexander Forbes d. 1690; 2nd Lord Forbes of Pitsligo; 1636–1690	Alexander Forbes of Foveran d. 1697	John Forbes, 2nd Baronet ("Red Sir John"); 1636–1703; 2nd Baronet of Craigievar and Fintray; 1648–1703	Arthur Forbes c. 1656–1734; 2nd Earl of Granard, etc., 3rd Baronet of Castle Forbes
William Forbes; 1656–1716; 12th Lord Forbes; 1697–1716	William Forbes of Monymusk; 4th Baronet of Monymusk	John Forbes b. 1680	Alexander Forbes c. 1655–1690; 3rd Lord Forbes of Pitsligo; 1690–1690	Samuel Forbes, 1st Baronet; 1653–1717; 1st Baronet of Foveran	John Forbes, of Knaperna	William Forbes, 3rd Baronet; 1660–c. 1730; 3rd Baronet of Craigievar and Fintray; 1703–c. 1730	George Forbes; 1685–1765; 3rd Earl of Granard, etc., 4th Baronet of Castle Forbes
William Forbes d. 1730; 13th Lord Forbes; 1716–1730	James Forbes; 1689–1761; 15th Lord Forbes; 1734–1761	Mary Forbes	John Forbes d. 1715	Alexander Forbes; 1678–1762; 4th Lord Forbes of Pitsligo; 1691–1748	William Forbes	Alexander Forbes, 2nd Baronet d. before 1755; 2nd Baronet of Foveran	Samuel Forbes, of Knaperna	Arthur Forbes; 1709–1773; 4th Baronet of Craigievar and Fintray c. 1730–1773	George Forbes; 1710–1769; 4th Earl of Granard, etc., 5th Baronet of Castle Forbes
Lordship Forbes of Pitsligo attainted, 1748
Francis Forbes; 1721–1734; 14th Lord Forbes; 1730–1734	James Forbes c. 1725–1804; 16th Lord Forbes; 1761–1804	William Forbes d. 1743; 5th Baronet of Monymusk; 1715–1743	Christian Forbes; 1705–1789	Forbes Baronets of Newe in the County of Aberdeen Charles Forbes; 1774–1849; 1st Baronet of Newe; 1823–1849	John Forbes d. c. 1760; 3rd Baronet of Knaperna	George Forbes; 1740–1780; 5th Earl of Granard, etc., 6th Baronet of Castle Forbes
Baronetcy of Foveran/Knaperna dormant, c. 1760
Baron Granard (UK), 1806
James Ochoncar Forbes; 1765–1843; 17th Lord Forbes; 1804–1843	William Forbes; 1739–1806; 6th Baronet of Monymusk, and later Pitsligo; 1743–1806	William Forbes; 1755–1816; 5th Baronet of Craigievar and Fintray; 1773–1816	George Forbes; 1760–1837; 6th Earl of Granard, etc., 1st Baron Granard, 7th Baronet of Castle Forbes
Walter Gammell Forbes; 1798–1868; 18th Lord Forbes; 1843–1868	Charlotte Elizabeth	William Forbes; 1773–1828; 7th Baronet of Monymusk; 1806–1828 [m. Williamina, daughter of Sir John Stuart/Belshes/Belshes-Wishart (3rd Baronet (S. 1707) of Fettercairn co. Kincardine]	Arthur Forbes, 6th Baronet; 1784–1823; 6th Baronet of Craigievar and Fintray; 1816–1823	John Forbes, 7th Baronet; 1785–1846; 7th Baronet of Craigievar and Fintray; 1823–1846	George Forbes; 1785–1836 styled Viscount Forbes
John Stuart Hepburn Forbes; 1804–1866; 8th Baronet of Monymusk, and later of Invermay and Balmanno; 1828–1866 [Inherited Invermay and Balmanno as heir and cousin of Alexander Hepburn-Murray-Belshes d. 1864]	Charles Hay Forbes; 1806–1859	William Forbes-Sempill; 1836–1905; 17th Lord Sempill; 1884–1905; 8th Baronet of Craigievar and Fintray; 1846–1905 (married Carlone Louisa, daughter of Charles Forbes, 3rd Baronet of Newe)	James Ochoncar Forbes; 1837–1900	George Arthur Hastings Forbes; 1833–1889; 7th Earl of Granard, etc., 2nd Baron Granard, 8th Baronet of Castle Forbes
Horace Courtenay Gammell Forbes; 1829–1914; 19th Lord Forbes; 1868–1914	Atholl Monson Forbes; 1841–1916; 20th Lord Forbes; 1914–1916	William Forbes; 1835–1906; 9th Baronet of Monymusk, Invermay, and Balmanno; 1866–1906	John Forbes-Sempill; 1863–1934; 18th Lord Sempill, 9th Baronet of Craigievar and Fintray; 1905–1934	Arthur Lionel Ochoncar Forbes-Sempill; 1877–1962	James Ochoncar Forbes; 1867–1945	Bernard Arthur William Patrick Hastings Forbes; 1874–1948; 8th Earl of Granard, etc., 3rd Baron Granard, 9th Baronet of Castle Forbes
Atholl Laurence Cunyngham; 1882–1953; 21st Lord Forbes; 1916–1953	Charles Hay Hepburn Stuart-Forbes of Pitsligo; 1871–1921; 10th Baronet of Monymusk, Invermay, and Balmanno; 1906–1921	William Francis Forbes-Sempill; 1893–1965; 19th Lord Sempill, 10th Baronet of Craigievar and Fintray; 1934–1965
Nigel Ivan Forbes; 1918–2013; 22nd Lord Forbes; 1953–2013	Ann Forbes-Sempill; 1920–1995; 20th Lady Sempill	Ewan Forbes; 1912–1991; 11th Baronet of Craigievar and Fintray; 1965–1991	John Alexander Cumnock Forbes; 1927–2000; 12th Baronet of Craigievar and Fintray; 1991–2000	Patrick Walter Forbes; 1914–1979	Arthur Patrick Hastings Forbes; 1915–1992; 9th Earl of Granard, etc., 4th Baron Granard, 10th Baronet of Castle Forbes	John Forbes; 1920–1982
Malcolm Nigel Forbes b. 1946; 23rd Lord Forbes since 2013	James Sempill b. 1949; 21st Lord Sempill	Andrew Iain Ochoncar Forbes; 1945–2003; 13th Baronet of Craigievar and Fintray; 2000–2003	Peter Arthur Edward Hastings Forbes b. 1957; 10th Earl of Granard, etc., 5th Baron Granard, 11th Baronet of Castle Forbes
Francis Henry William Sempill b. 1979 styled Master of Sempill	James Patrick Ochoncar Forbes b. 1986; 14th Baronet of Craigievar and Fintray since 2003	David Ian Ochoncar Forbes b. 1993; Heir presumptive to the Baronetage of Craigievar and Fintray	Jonathan Peter Hastings Forbes b. 1981 styled Viscount Forbes

== See also ==
- Lord Forbes
- Forbes baronets
