= Forbes (disambiguation) =

Forbes is an American business magazine.

Forbes may also refer to:

== People ==
- Forbes (name) for people with this name
- Clan Forbes, a Scottish clan
- Forbes family, a wealthy extended American family originating in Boston
- Lord Forbes, the senior Lord of Parliament in the Peerage of Scotland

== Places ==
- Forbes, Missouri, an unincorporated community
- Forbes Township, a township in Missouri
- Forbes, North Dakota, a small town in southern Dickey County
- Mount Forbes, a mountain in the Canadian Rockies
- Forbes Avenue (named after General John Forbes), one of the longest streets in Pittsburgh, Pennsylvania
- Forbes Bridge, first concrete bridge in the Philippines
- Forbes Field, the former home of the Pittsburgh Pirates
- Forbes Mill, a former mill, now a museum, in Los Gatos, California
- Forbes, New South Wales, a town in Australia
- Forbes Shire, New South Wales, a local government area
- Forbes Park (disambiguation)
  - Forbes Park, Makati, Philippines
  - Forbes Park, Chelsea, Massachusetts, United States
- Forbes, Ottawa, a neighbourhood in Ottawa, Canada
- Forbes, the German name for Borovany, Czech Republic
- Forbes River, a tributary of the Caniapiscau River, Nunavik, Nord-du-Québec, Quebec, Canada
- Mount Forbes (New Zealand), a mountain in Canterbury Region

== Other uses ==
- Forbes (band), a Swedish music band
- Forbes (engineering company), an Indian engineering, shipping and logistics company based in Mumbai, established by John Forbes
- John Forbes and Company, 18th & 19th-century Scottish merchant traders
- List of ships named Forbes, ships of this name, or derivatives

== See also ==
- Forb, a type of flowering plant
- Fraternal Order of Real Bearded Santas (FORBS), an organization for men who look like Santa Claus
