= Castle Forbes, County Longford =

Castle Forbes
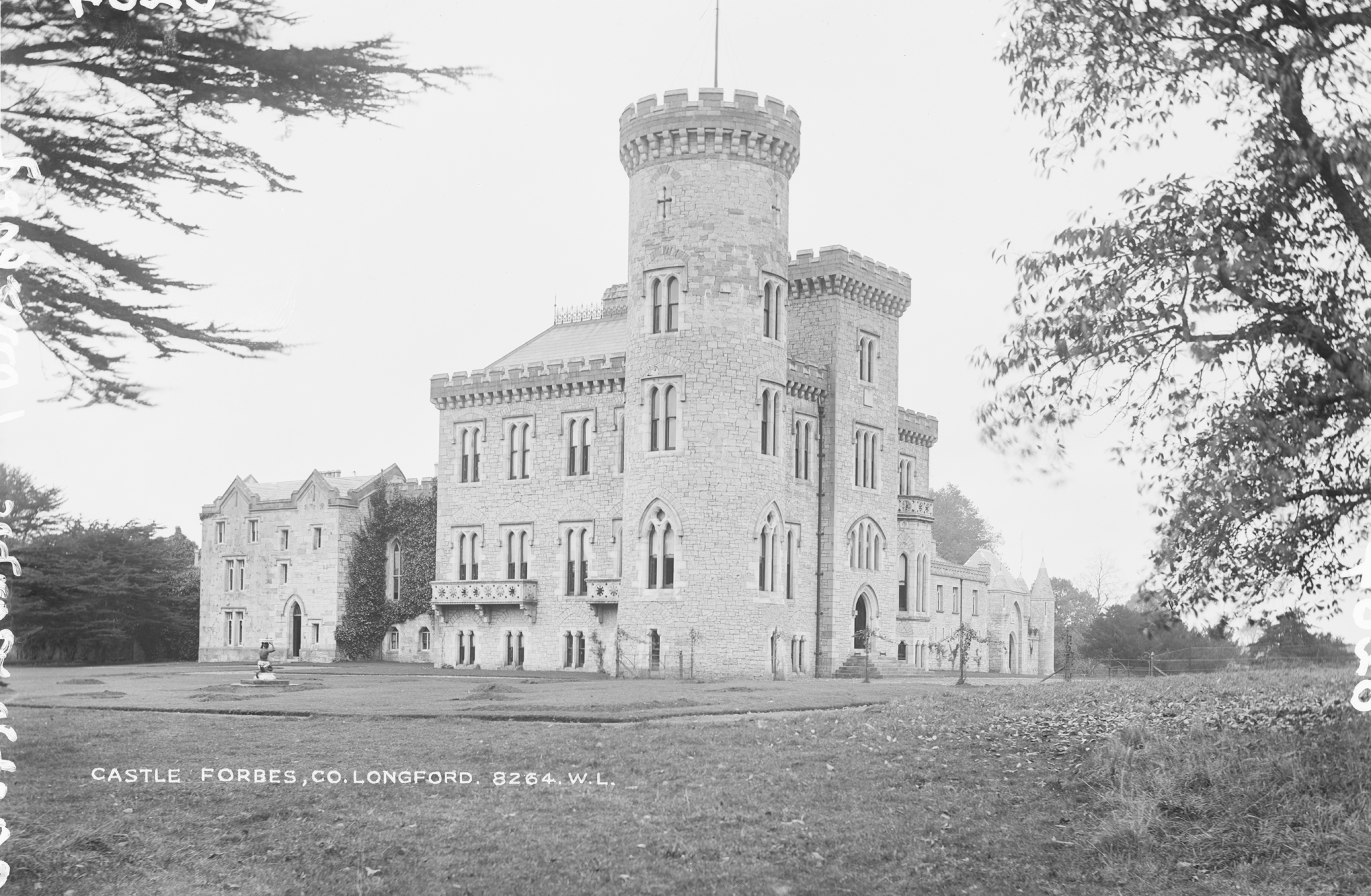
- A photograph of the castle c. 1900

General information
- Status: Private dwelling house
- Type: House
- Architectural style: Gothic revival
- Location: Newtownforbes County Longford, Ireland
- Coordinates: 53.7711°N 7.8506°W
- Elevation: 50 m (160 ft)

Technical details
- Material: limestone and granite

Design and construction
- Architects: John Hargrave (1819-30); JJ McCarthy (1860-80)
- Developer: Earl of Granard

Castle Forbes is a gothic revival castellated house and demesne in Newtownforbes, County Longford, Ireland. The castle is the ancestral home of the eponymous Forbes family and still remains the seat of the Earl of Granard as of 2025.

The house incorporates some of the fabric of an earlier 17th-century structure to a structure which is mainly 19th century in origin with other additions also having been made in the 18th and 20th centuries.

== History ==
=== 17th to 18th century ===
In 1623, as part of the Plantations of Longford, 1,266 acres were granted to Scottish planter Captain Arthur Forbes which included the castle and lands of Clonguesh and Lisbrack in County Longford along with manorial privileges. The family are direct descendants of James Forbes, 2nd Lord Forbes (died 1476) of Corse Castle in Aberdeenshire.

In 1624, Captain Forbes constructed an 'L' shaped house, 55 metres to the south east of the present castle. His son Arthur Forbes, 1st Earl of Granard later added extensively to it over the next few decades including adding pleasure gardens before he died in 1696.

The castle underwent a severe siege and was badly damaged during the Irish Rebellion of 1641 with all of the British tenants of the Forbes in County Longford used to defend the castle.

There is trace of 18th-century furnishings and structural additions to the castle from the 18th century indicating works were also carried out during this period.

=== 19th century onwards ===
After a fire occurred during works in 1825?, the castle wings were later remodelled by John Hargrave between 1819 and 1830, resulting in the family of the 6th Earl of Granard living mainly in the wings.

The main house appears to have again only been finally remodelled c. 1860–1880 by James Joseph McCarthy who also designed a new gatehouse.

It was restored and remodelled again by the London architect William Foster c. 1923–1925 following fire damage for Bernard Forbes, 8th Earl of Granard. The interiors, including the dining room, drawing room and library, were also refurbished around this time with the help of the London firm of Lenygon and Morant and with the assistance of Beatrice Forbes, Countess of Granard. The Dublin firm of Kaye-Parry and Ross also assisted with some additions at this time.

In the 21st century, parts of the historic old-growth forest which covered the estate were controversially felled without the required permissions.

== Facilities ==
The demesne houses a small airfield.

== Notable contents ==
In 2014, a notable table from the property was sold at auction with Christies for GBP £482,500. The table was probably acquired by Admiral John Forbes when in Rome in 1755. The table has a late 16th- or early 17th-century top and a repurposed wooden gilted legs of c. 1755.
