= Forbes (name) =

Forbes is a surname and a rare given name. The surname derives from the Scottish Clan Forbes (after a toponym, from Gaelic forba "field"). Descendants of the Scottish clan have also been present in Ireland since the 17th century. The name of an unrelated Irish sept, Mac Fhirbhisigh or MacFirbis, was also anglicised as Forbes.

Notable people with the name include:

== Aristocracy ==
- Clan Forbes, descendants of Alexander de Forbes, 1st Lord Forbes (c. 1380–1448): see Lord Forbes, Lord Forbes of Pitsligo
  - Nigel Forbes, 22nd Lord Forbes (1918–2013), Scottish soldier, businessman and politician
- Forbes baronets of the Baronetage of Nova Scotia: four distinct baronetcies for people called Forbes:
  - Forbes, later Stuart-Forbes, of Monymusk, created 1626 for William Forbes (died c. 1650)
    - Sir William Forbes, 6th Baronet (1739–1806)
  - Forbes, of Castle Forbes, created 1628 for Arthur Forbes (c. 1590–1632): see Earl of Granard
  - Forbes, of Craigievar, created 1630 for William Forbes (died 1648)
    - Sir Ewan Forbes, 11th Baronet (1912–1991)
      - Isabella Forbes, Lady Forbes (1913–2002), wife of Sir Ewan
  - Forbes of Foveran, created 1700 for Samuel Forbes (c. 1663 – 1717), extinct with the death of the 3rd baronet, John Forbes, c. 1760
- Forbes baronets of Newe in the County of Aberdeen, created 1823 for Charles Forbes (1774–1849).
  - Hamish Forbes, 7th Baronet (1916–2007

== Artists ==
- Edwin Forbes (1839–1895), American landscape painter, etcher, and war artist during the American Civil War
- Elizabeth Forbes (artist) (1859–1912), Canadian artist
- Stanhope Forbes (1857–1947), Irish painter

== Businesspeople ==
- Forbes family, a wealthy extended Canadian/American Family descended from John Forbes (1740–1783), an Anglican clergyman of Strathdon, Aberdeenshire, recorded in Milton, Massachusetts, by 1769
  - Robert Pierce Forbes (born 1958), American historian
  - William Cameron Forbes (1870–1959), American investment banker and diplomat, Governor-General of the Philippines (1908–13), US Ambassador to Japan (1930–32) and namesake of Forbes Park gated community
- George Forbes (businessman) (1944–2022), Scottish businessman
- James Staats Forbes (1823–1904), Scottish railway engineer, administrator, businessman and art collector
- John Murray Forbes (1813–1898), American businessman and philanthropist
- Walter Forbes, American executive and convicted fraudster

== Musicians ==
- China Forbes (born 1970), American singer and songwriter
- Derek Forbes (born 1956), Scottish singer and musician
- Elizabeth Forbes (musicologist) (1924–2014), English critic and musicologist
- Elliot Forbes (1917–2006), American conductor and musicologist
- Kiernan Forbes (1988–2023), South African hip hop musician
- Watson Forbes (1909–1997), Scottish musician, viola specialist

== Performers and affiliated professions ==
- Brenda Forbes (1909–1996), British-born American actress
- Bryan Forbes (1926–2013), English film director, actor and writer
- Mary Forbes (1883–1974), British-American actress
- Maya Forbes (born 1968), American producer and director
- Michelle Forbes (born 1965), American actress
- Ralph Forbes (1904–1952), English actor

== Politicians ==
- Archie Forbes (1913–1999), Permanent Secretary of the Ministry of Agriculture & Cooperative Development in Tanganyika (1960–1963)
- Frederick Augustus Forbes (1818–1878), Australian politician
- George Forbes (New Zealand politician) (1869–1947), Prime Minister of New Zealand from 1930 to 1935
- George L. Forbes (born 1931), American politician
- Jim Forbes (Australian politician) (1923–2019), Australian soldier and politician
- John Murray Forbes (diplomat) (1771–1831), American diplomat
- Kate Forbes (born 1990), Scottish politician who is currently the Deputy First Minister of Scotland
- Michael Forbes (politician) (born 1952), American politician
- Muriel Forbes (1894–1991), British politician
- Peter W. Forbes (1850–1923), Canadian-born member of the California legislature
- Ralph Perry Forbes (1940–2018), American neo-Nazi and Arkansas political candidate
- Randy Forbes (born 1952), American politician in US House of Representatives
- Thelma Forbes (1910–2012), Canadian politician in Manitoba
- William Henry Forbes (c.1815–1875), American territorial legislator

== Publishers ==
- Forbes family (publishers), an American family
  - B. C. Forbes (1880–1954), founder of Forbes magazine
  - Christopher Forbes (born 1950), American vice-chairman of the Forbes Publishing Company
  - Malcolm Forbes (1919–1990), publisher of Forbes magazine, son of B. C.
  - Steve Forbes (born 1947), American businessman, current publisher of Forbes Magazine

== Scientists ==
- David McHattie Forbes (1863–1937), Scottish botanist and ethnologist in Hawai'i
- Edward Forbes (1815–1854), British naturalist
- Fayette F. Forbes (1851–1935), American water engineer, plant collector, and botanist
- Francis Blackwell Forbes (1839–1908), American merchant and botanist in China
- George Forbes (scientist) (1849–1936), Scottish electrical engineer, astronomer, explorer, author and inventor
- Gregory S. Forbes (born 1950), American meteorologist
- Henry Ogg Forbes (1851–1932), British ornithologist, botanist and museum director
- James David Forbes (1809–1868), Scottish physicist and glaciologist
- John Forbes (1798–1823), English botanist
- John J. Forbes (1885–1975), American mining engineer
- Stephen Alfred Forbes (1844–1930), American entomologist and ecologist
- William Alexander Forbes (1855–1883), British zoologist
- William Trowbridge Merrifield Forbes (1885–1968), American entomologist
- John Forbes Nash Jr. (1928–2015), American mathematician; Economic Science's Nobel Prize awarded in 1994

== Sportspeople ==
- Alex Forbes (1925–2014), Scottish footballer
- Bryn Forbes (born 1993), American basketball player
- Colin Forbes (ice hockey) (born 1976), Canadian ice hockey player
- Drew Forbes (born 1997), American football player
- Elizabeth Forbes (athlete) (1910–2002), New Zealand track and field athlete
- Emmanuel Forbes (born 2001), American football player
- Fred Forbes (1894-after 1933), Scottish footballer
- Gary Forbes (born 1985), Panamanian-born American basketball player
- Gordon Forbes (1934–2020), South African tennis player
- Harry Forbes (boxer) (1879–1946), American boxer
- Harry Forbes (rugby league), Australian rugby player and coach
- McKenzie Forbes (born 2000), American basketball player
- Melanie Forbes (born 1999), Canadian soccer player
- Ross Forbes (born 1989), Scottish footballer who plays for Motherwell
- Tatyana Forbes (born 1997), American softball player
- Terrell Forbes (born 1981), British footballer
- W. J. Forbes (1874–1900), American college sports coach

== Writers ==
- Archibald Forbes (1838–1900), British war correspondent
- Colin Forbes (novelist), pseudonym of British novelist Raymond Harold Sawkins
- Edith Willis Linn Forbes (1865–1945), American poet and writer
- Esther Forbes (1891–1967), American novelist and children's writer
- Lani Forbes (1987–2022), American author of young adult fantasy novels
- Mihingarangi Forbes, New Zealand journalist, presenter and radio broadcaster
- Moira Forbes (born 1979), American journalist

== Others ==
- Jack D. Forbes (1934 – 2011), American historian, writer, scholar, and political activist
- James Forbes (1749–1819), British traveller and artist
- James A. Forbes, American clergyman
- John Forbes (British Army officer) (1707–1759), British general in the French and Indian War
- Sir John Forbes (1925–2021), British admiral
- Kristin Forbes (born 1970), American economist
- Michael Forbes (farmer), Scottish farmer
- Norman Hay Forbes (1863–1916), British doctor and academic
- Rosemary Forbes Kerry (1913–2002), American activist and mother of John Kerry

== Given name ==
Forbes as a given name is rare, mostly known due to Forbes Burnham (full name Linden Forbes Sampson Burnham , 1923–1985), leader of Guyana from 1964 until his death.

Forbes Kennedy (born 1935) is a Canadian former ice hockey player.

Forbes McAllister is a fictional character (a "cynical restaurant critic") from Knowing Me, Knowing You... with Alan Partridge (1994).
