= Alexander Forbes =

Alexander Forbes may refer to:

== Scottish noblemen ==
- Alexander Forbes, 1st Lord Forbes (died 1448), Scottish baron
- Alexander Forbes, 4th Lord Forbes (died 1491), Scottish baron
- Alexander Forbes, 10th Lord Forbes (died 1672), Scottish baron, the 10th Lord Forbes
- Alexander Forbes, 4th Lord Forbes of Pitsligo (1678–1762), Scottish philosopher and Jacobite

== Other people ==
- Alexander Forbes (bishop of Aberdeen) (1564–1617), bishop of Aberdeen
- Alexander Forbes (bishop of Brechin) (1817–1875), Scottish Episcopal Bishop of Brechin
- Alexander Kinloch Forbes (1821–1865), British administrator in India, writer
- Alexander Forbes (explorer) (1778–1862), Scottish explorer
- Alexander F. I. Forbes (1871–1959), South African astronomer
- Alexander Forbes (neurophysiologist) (1882–1965), American neurophysiologist and medical school professor
- Alex Forbes (1925–2014), Scottish football player (Arsenal, Scotland)
- Alex S. Forbes (fl. 1928–1935), Scottish football player
- Jim Forbes (Australian politician) (Alexander James Forbes, 1923–2019), Australian soldier and politician

== Businesses ==
- Alexander Forbes Group Holdings, a financial services group with its head office in South Africa
