= Lisa Forbes =

Lisa Forbes may refer to:

- Lisa Forbes (politician) (born 1969), British Member of Parliament
- Lisa Forbes (beauty queen) (born 1981), American beauty queen

== See also ==
- Forbes (disambiguation)
- Forbes (surname)
- Lisa (disambiguation)
