= Adelaide FitzGerald =

Irish aristocrat and philanthropist

Lady Maurice FitzGerald
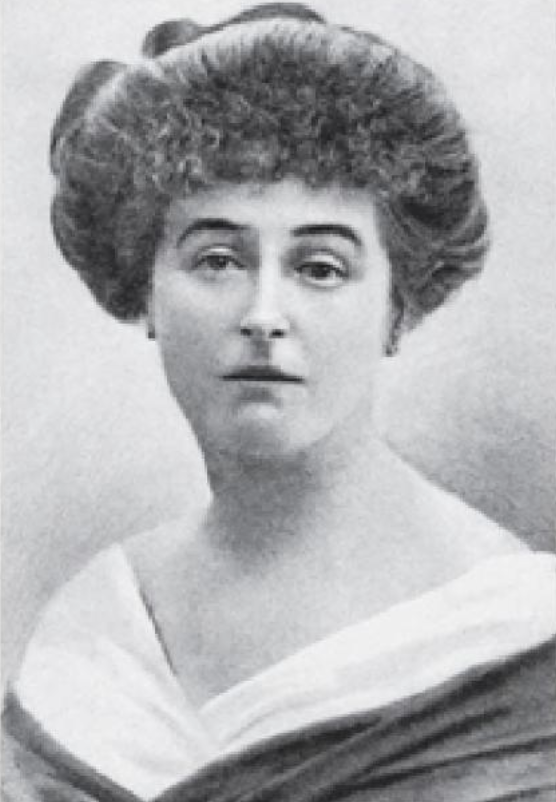
- Born: 1860; Castle Forbes, Newtownforbes, County Longford
- Died: 18 November 1942 (aged 81–82); Johnstown Castle, County Wexford
- Resting place: Private cemetery at Johnstown Castle
- Spouse: Lord Maurice FitzGerald (m. 1880; died 1901)
- Children: 4, only one of whom survived Lady Maurice
- Parent(s): Jane Colclough Grogan Morgan and George Arthur Hastings Forbes, 7th Earl of Granard

Lady Maurice FitzGerald, born Lady Adelaide Jane Frances Forbes (1860 – 18 November 1942), was an active member of the Wexford community, supporting children's welfare. She and her husband were the last people to reside in Johnstown Castle; after her death it became part of an agricultural college. Throughout her adult life she actively participated and led efforts to help the poor, those needing medical care, abused animals, and more.

== Personal life ==
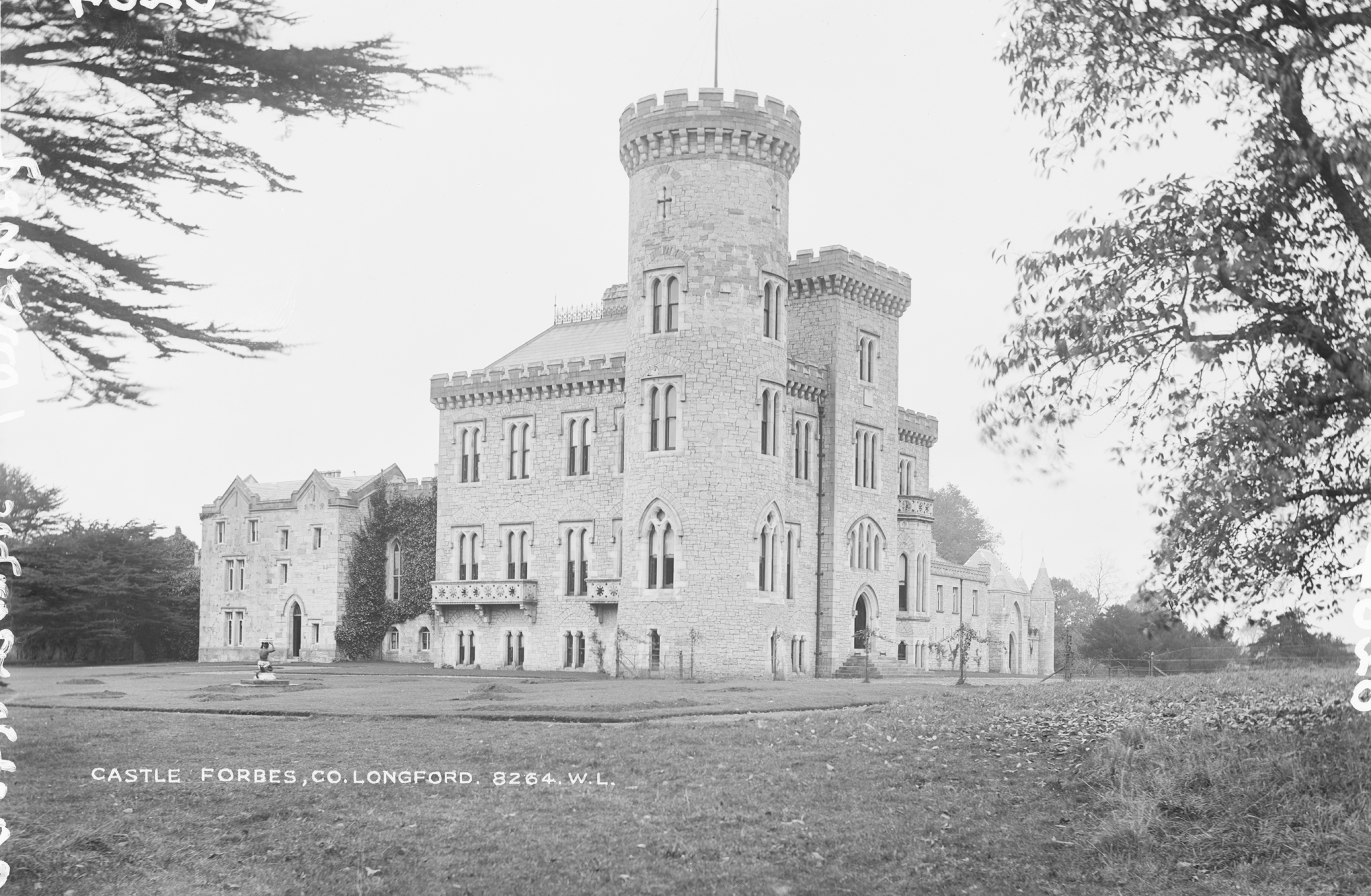
Castle Forbes, County Longford

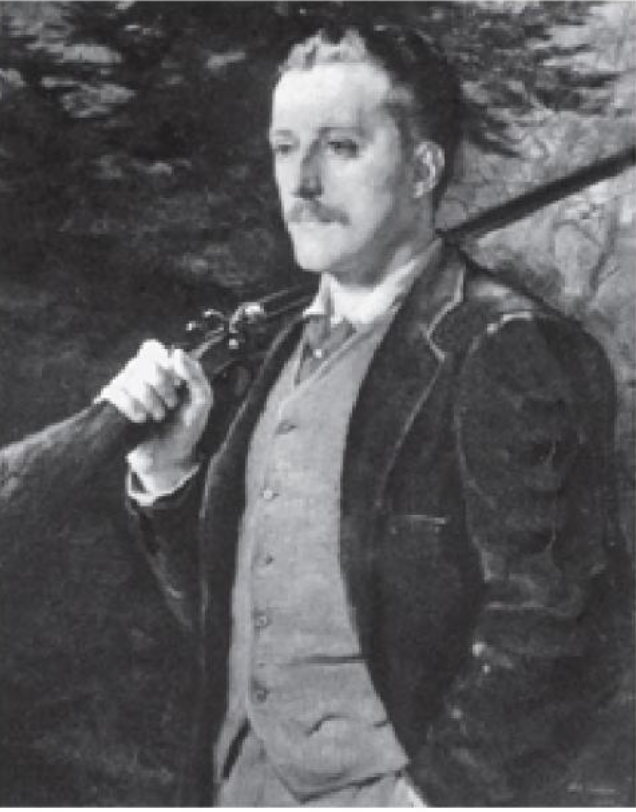
Lord Maurice Fitzgerald.png

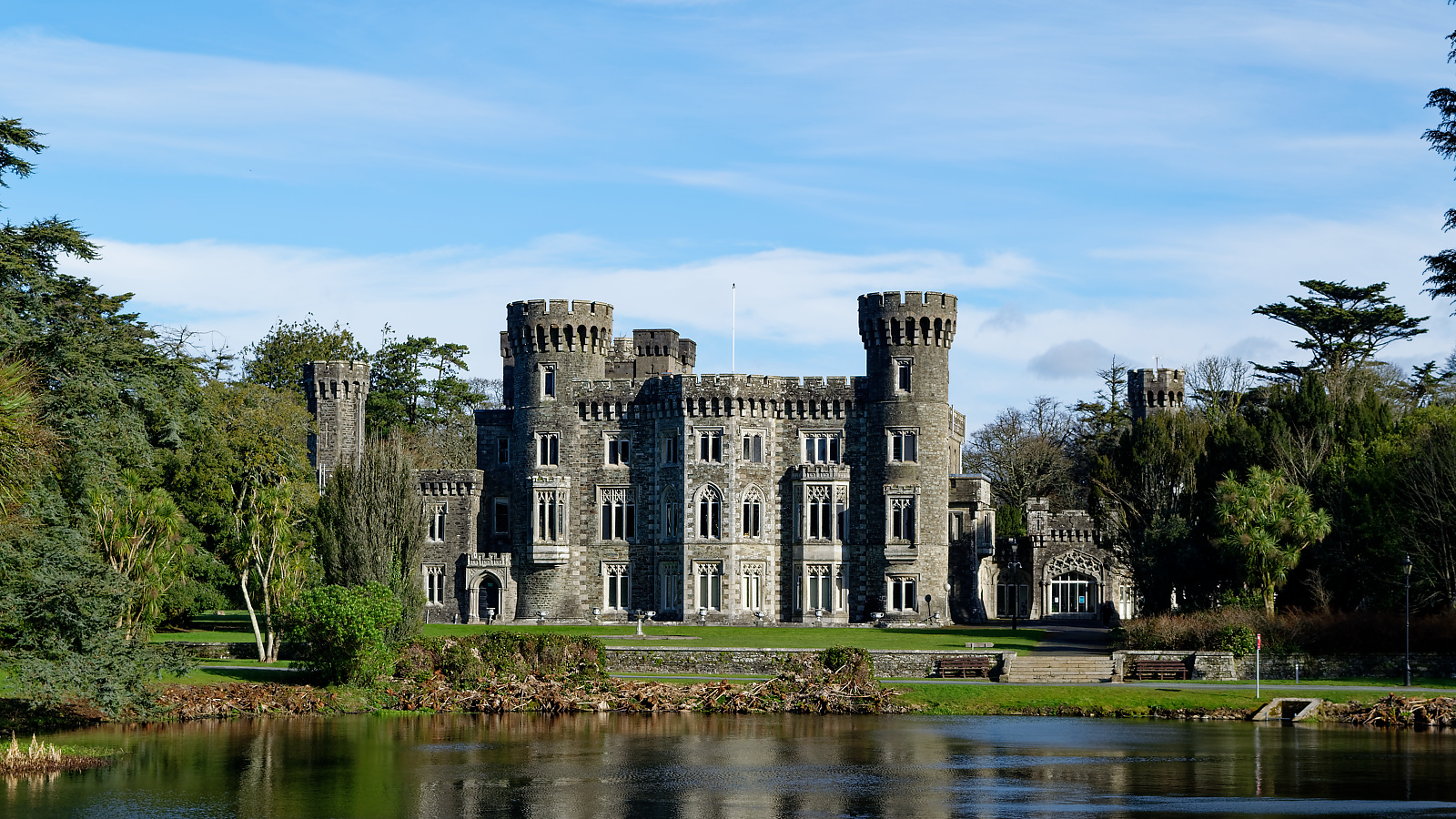
Johnstown Castle, Wexford

Born Lady Adelaide Jane Frances Forbes, she was the eldest daughter of George Arthur Hastings Forbes, 7th Earl of Granard, and the Countess of Granard (née Jane Colclough Grogan Morgan of Johnstown Castle). She was born at Castle Forbes, Newtownforbes, County Longford, in 1860. Her sister Sarah married Sir Henry Grattan-Bellew, becoming Lady Grattan-Bellew, and lived at Castle Forbes. The 8th Earl of Granard was her half-brother.

She married in April 1880 Lord Maurice FitzGerald (1852-1901), second son of Charles FitzGerald, 4th Duke of Leinster. They required and received a dispensation from the Pope (Leo XIII) because Lady Adelaide was Roman Catholic and Lord Maurice was a Protestant. They agreed to raise their children as Catholics. Lord Maurice served in Sir Edward Hornby's squadron after eight years in the Navy. He lived in Carton House until his marriage. Lady Maurice and her husband had four children: Geraldine (1880-1954), Gerald Hugh (1883-1914), Kathleen (1892-1930) and Marjorie (1896-1899).

Lord Maurice FitzGerald died on 24 April 1901 of cerebral meningitis following a couple of days of influenza. He was aged 48. His brother, Lord Arthur Fitzgerald, along with Lady Maurice, were appointed guardians of their children. Her first cousin Ronald Forbes helped her manage Johnstown Castle.

Her son Gerald was killed in France in September 1914, during the early months of World War I while serving with the 4th Royal Irish Dragoon Guards. The inscription chosen for her son's gravestone in France reads: "THE SOULS OF THE RIGHTEOUS ARE IN THE HAND OF GOD".

Her daughter Kathleen died in 1930.

== Community activist ==
While both Lord and Lady Maurice were alive, they looked after the interests of poor Catholics, particularly ensuring that they received proper medical and hospital care, as well as final rites as they died. Lord Maurice was also concerned about the welfare of abused animals, orphaned children, those imprisoned, and the mentally ill.

Lady Maurice, as she became known after her husband's death, was an important figure in the Wexford area as the head of a variety of organisations including the Wexford Board of Guardians, Wexford branch of National Society for the Prevention of Cruelty to Children, Women's National Health Association, Wexford Horticultural Society, and South Wexford Beekeepers Association. She took over the community efforts that her husband aided and she was involved in church activities. Like her late husband, she was particularly concerned about the poor.

During the First World War, Lady Maurice participated in the Queen Mother's Clothing Guild as chairperson of the Wexford branch and was a leader of the aid to Belgian refugees in Britain during the First World War.

== Death and estate settlement ==
She died in November 1942 at the age of 82 and is buried with other family members in the private cemetery near the walled garden at Johnstown Castle. She left an unsettled estate. Three out of her four children predeceased her, including Gerald, their only son and heir to the family estate. Following her death, Lady Maurice's grandson, Maurice Victor Lakin, handed over the Johnstown Castle estate to the Irish State in lieu of death duties to be used an agricultural college.
