= List of listed buildings in Coull, Aberdeenshire =

This is a list of listed buildings in the parish of Coull in Aberdeenshire, Scotland.

== List ==
Name	Location	Date Listed	Grid Ref. (Note: Sometimes known as OSGB36, the grid reference (where provided) is based on the British national grid reference system used by the Ordnance Survey. • "Guide to National Grid". Ordnance Survey. • "Get-a-map". Ordnance Survey.)	Geo-coordinates	Notes	LB Number (Note: Historic Environment Scotland assign a unique alphanumeric identifier to each designated site in Scotland, for listed buildings this always begins with "LB", for example "LB12345".)	Image
Corse, House Of Corse Including Gatehouse And Entrance Piers				57°09′23″N 2°45′03″W	Category B	49492	Upload Photo
Springbank Mill Including Former Shop Premises And Mill Workings				57°07′08″N 2°48′24″W	Category B	49497	Upload Photo
Corse, Old Tollhouse				57°09′13″N 2°43′57″W	Category C(S)	2969	Upload Photo
Corse, Winds'Eye Farm				57°09′48″N 2°45′30″W	Category B	49493	Upload Photo
Coull, Coull House				57°05′55″N 2°47′22″W	Category B	49495	Upload Photo
Coull, Kirklands Of Coull Including Walled Garden Incorporating Bee Bole				57°06′41″N 2°48′26″W	Category B	2970	Upload Photo
Coull, Coull Bridge				57°06′40″N 2°48′35″W	Category C(S)	49494	Upload Photo
Coull Outdoor Centre Including Teacher's House, Boiler House And Boundary Wall				57°07′04″N 2°48′15″W	Category C(S)	49496	Upload Photo
Corse, Corse Castle				57°09′19″N 2°44′52″W	Category B	2968	Upload Photo
North Gellan Farm				57°06′44″N 2°49′52″W	Category C(S)	49160	Upload Photo
Coull, St Nathalan's, Coull Parish Church Including Churchyard, Morte House, Boundary Wall And Gatepiers				57°06′38″N 2°48′27″W	Category B	2966	Upload Photo
Crossfold Farm, Bothy				57°06′42″N 2°50′28″W	Category C(S)	49158	Upload Photo

== Key ==
The scheme for classifying buildings in Scotland is:

- Category A: "buildings of national or international importance, either architectural or historic; or fine, little-altered examples of some particular period, style or building type."
- Category B: "buildings of regional or more than local importance; or major examples of some particular period, style or building type, which may have been altered."
- Category C: "buildings of local importance; lesser examples of any period, style, or building type, as originally constructed or moderately altered; and simple traditional buildings which group well with other listed buildings."

In March 2016 there were 47,288 listed buildings in Scotland. Of these, 8% were Category A, and 50% were Category B, with the remaining 42% being Category C.

== See also ==
- List of listed buildings in Aberdeenshire
