= Robert Forbes =

Robert Forbes may refer to:

- Robert Forbes (American football) (1886–1947), American football player and coach
- Robert Forbes (bishop) (1708–1775), Scottish Episcopal bishop of Ross and Caithness
- Robert Bennet Forbes (1804–1889), sea captain, China merchant, ship owner, and writer
- Robert Jacobus Forbes (1900–1973), historian of science
- Robert Pierce Forbes (born 1958), American historian
- Robert C. Forbes (1917–2002), U.S. Army general
