= Arthur Forbes, 2nd Earl of Granard =

Irish soldier and peer

Arthur Forbes, 2nd Earl of Granard (c. 1656 – 1 April 1724), was an Irish soldier and peer.

== Early life ==
Forbes was born c. 1656 as the eldest son of Arthur Forbes of Castle Forbes in Aberdeenshire and the former Catharine (née Newcomen) Stewart (widow of Sir Alexander Stewart, 2nd Baronet). His mother was the eldest daughter of Sir Robert Newcomen, 4th Baronet, of Kenagh, and the former Anne Boleyn. His younger sister, Lady Catharine Forbes, was married to Arthur Chichester, 3rd Earl of Donegall, as his second wife.

His paternal grandfather was Arthur Forbes, who was created a Baronet of Castle Forbes in the Baronetage of Nova Scotia on 29 September 1628. In 1632, Forbes' father succeeded as the 2nd Baronet. In November 1675, his father was created Baron Clanehugh and Viscount of Granard in his own right, followed by the earldom of Granard on 30 December 1684.

== Career ==
Forbes was a Col. of the 18th Regiment of Foot (the Royal Irish regiment) from 1686 to 1688, when he was removed by King William III and was thrice imprisoned in the Tower of London for his "suspected co-operation with the Stuarts". He served on the Continent under Henri de La Tour d'Auvergne, Viscount of Turenne, and took part in the Siege of Buda in 1686 as part of the Great Turkish War. His younger brother, Lt.-Col. Hon. Robert Forbes, was killed in the trenches in the Siege of Buda.

He was in favour of William III's successor, Queen Anne, and during her reign, he received an offer of the governorship of Jamaica, which as a non-juror he declined.

== Personal life ==
In October 1678, Forbes married Mary Rawdon (1661–1724), eldest daughter of Sir George Rawdon, 1st Baronet, of Moira, by his second wife, Hon. Dorothy Conway (eldest daughter of Edward Conway, 2nd Viscount Conway). Together, they were the parents of several children, including:

- Arthur Forbes, styled Lord Forbes, died unmarried in 1704.
- George Forbes, 3rd Earl of Granard (1685–1765), who married Hon. Mary (née Stewart) Preston, widow of Phineas Preston and eldest daughter of William Stewart, 1st Viscount Mountjoy, and Hon. Mary Coote (herself the eldest daughter of Richard Coote, 1st Baron Coote), in 1709.
- Lady Jane Forbes (d. 1760), married Maj. Josias Champagne of Portarlington (d. 1737).
- Lady Dorothy Forbes (d. 1779), died unmarried.

Lady Granard died on 1 April 1724. Lord Granard died on 24 August 1734 and was buried at Newtownforbes, County Longford. He was succeeded in the earldom by his eldest son George.

== Coat of arms ==
Coat of arms of Arthur Forbes, 2nd Earl of Granard
Coronet A coronet of an Earl Crest Azure three Bears' Heads couped Argent muzzled Gules. Escutcheon A Bear statant Argent guttée de sang muzzled Gules. Supporters Dexter: an Unicorn Erminois armed maned tufted and unguled Or; Sinister: a Dragon wings expanded Ermine. Motto Fax Mentis Incendium Gloriae (The incitement to glory is the firebrand of the mind)

Peerage of Ireland
Preceded by Arthur Forbes	Earl of Granard; 1696–1734	Succeeded by George Forbes
Preceded by Arthur Forbes	Viscount Granard; 1696–1734	Succeeded by George Forbes
Baronetage of Nova Scotia
Preceded by Arthur Forbes	Baronet (of Castle Forbes); 1696–1734	Succeeded by George Forbes
