= Forbes Park =

Forbes Park may refer to:

- Forbes Park, Makati, Philippines
- Forbes Park, Chelsea, Massachusetts, United States
