= Walter Forbes, 18th Lord Forbes =

Scottish peer (1798–1868)

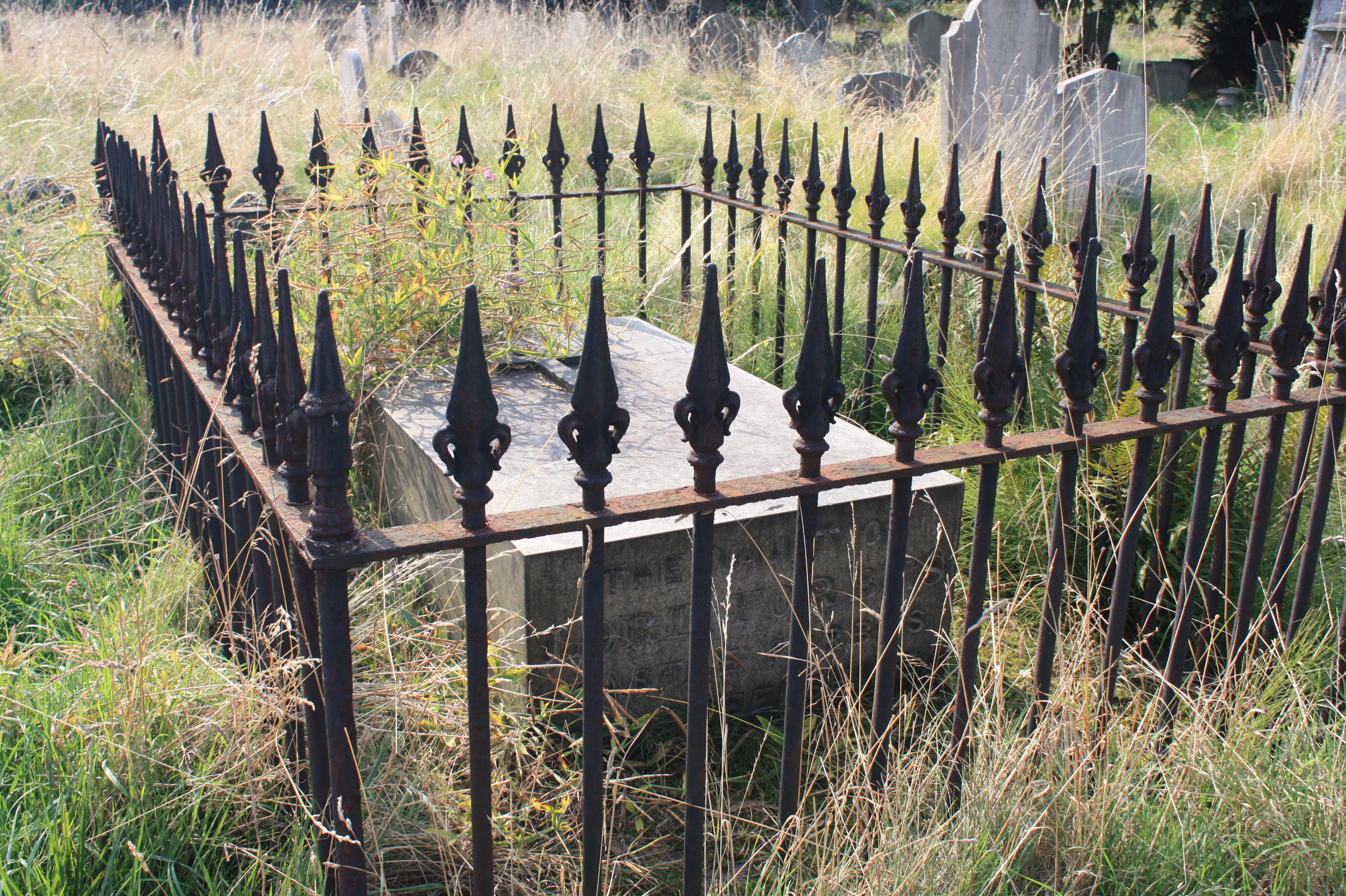
The grave of Walter Forbes, Lord Forbes, Brompton Cemetery, London

Walter Gammell Forbes, 18th Lord Forbes (29 May 1798 – 2 May 1868) was a Scottish peer.

== Biography ==
Walter Forbes was the son of James Ochoncar Forbes, 17th Lord Forbes and Elizabeth Hunter. He was a member of the Coldstream Guards and served as one of the youngest officers during the Battle of Waterloo. After the war, he built the new Forbes Castle in Alford, Aberdeenshire, in 1815.

He married Horatia Shaw on 31 January 1825 and had three children – Hon. Horace Courtenay Gammel Forbes, Hon. Charles Murray Hay Forbes, and Hon. Atholl Monson Forbes. On 4 April 1864, he married Louisa Ormond and had two children – Hon. Walter Robert Drummond Forbes and Hon. Montagu Ormond Forbes.

Walter Forbes is in buried in Brompton Cemetery in London. He was succeeded in turn by his eldest son, Horace, who committed suicide in 1914 and his third son Atholl Monson (his second son Charles having died in 1874).

Peerage of Scotland
Preceded by James Forbes	Lord Forbes; 1843–1868	Succeeded by Horace Forbes
