= James Forbes, 16th Lord Forbes =

James Forbes, 16th Lord Forbes (died 29 July 1804) was a Scottish peer. He was the son of James Forbes, 15th Lord Forbes.

== Personal life ==
In 1760, he married Catherine Innes and they had six children:

- Mary Elizabeth Forbes (d. 1803)
- Marjory Forbes (1761–1842)
- James Ochoncar Forbes, 17th Lord Forbes (1765–1843)
- Robert Allaster Cam Forbes, Captain Royal Navy (d. HMS Dryad, 1795)
- Andrew Forbes (d. 1808)
- William Forbes (d. 1792)

Masonic offices
Preceded by Charles Hamilton Gordon	Grand Master of the Grand Lodge of Scotland; 1754–1755	Succeeded by Lord Aberdour
Peerage of Scotland
Preceded by Francis Forbes	Lord Forbes; 1761–1804	Succeeded by James Forbes
