= Fraternal Order of Real Bearded Santas =

US organization on Santa Claus

- FORBS trademark
- Abbreviation: FORBS
- Formation: January 1995
- Type: 501(c)(7)
- Headquarters: Orange County, California
- Region served: National
- Members: 851
- Chairman: Ric Erwin
- President: Allen Cornwell
- Vice President: Barry Walzberg
- Secretary: Sam Martinez
- Board of directors: Chapter Directors
- Key people: Robert Perry, Tom Tingesdahl, Craig Ball, Bob Callet, Glenn Reathaford, Jim Walker
- Website: forbsantas.com
- Formerly called: Amalgamated Order of Real Bearded Santas

The Fraternal Order of Real Bearded Santas (FORBS) is a professional 501(c)(7) fraternity for American men who perform as Santa Claus. Members must grow and maintain their own facial hair for that purpose, and agree to promote a positive image of Santa. The organization is a non-profit, mutual benefit, voting member corporation based in Orange County, California. It has members in nearly every state, with local and regional chapters meeting monthly to socialize, provide peer support and training. Membership dues are $40 per year.

FORBS provides a comprehensive professional benefits package for the Christmas community—including in-depth background checks provided by the same company which serves the U.S. departments of State and Defense, as well as the entertainment industry's first liability insurance policy to also defend performers against false allegations of abuse or molestation; protection ranges from two to four million dollars per member.

== History ==
In 1994, German mail-order catalog company Otto Versand put supermodel Cindy Crawford on the cover of their fall/winter catalog edition, and decided to produce a related TV commercial; the theme was to be "Thanks To Our Catalog, This Year Santa's Going To Need A LOT Of Help!"—and would feature ten Santas bustling up and down Paramount's Brownstone Street set, bumping into one another as they delivered armfuls of wrapped gifts and packages. The shoot lasted more than 12 hours, and between takes the Santas swapped stories about their most- and least-favorite gigs. They had so much fun that they decided to get together for lunch—after their upcoming Christmas season ended. They all met on the final Sunday in January 1995 beneath the perpetually-snow-covered eaves of Clearman's Northwoods Inn in La Mirada, California, and one of them suggested their group needed a name; remembering the casting call to which they had all responded ("Santa Wanted-- Must have own suit and REAL BEARD"), the commercial's lead actor, Santa Tom Hartsfield, suggested the rather whimsical Amalgamated Order of Real Bearded Santas; the name stuck, and the luncheon was so much fun that they decided to meet again on the same Sunday the following year. The Santas brought friends and by the third year, there were over twenty of them. This casual "lunch date" continued to grow over the following decade, until there were 150 or more professional Santas and Mrs. Clauses gathering each January for what became known as the Annual Santa Luncheon.

In 2003, with so many guests attending the event, FORBS founder Tom Hartsfield reached out to perhaps the country's most famous Claus, Santa Tim Connaghan (the "Hollywood Parade Santa"). In response to guest inquiries regarding where to purchase quality suits and other accoutrements, Connaghan invited Adele's of Hollywood to display some of their Santa wear, which soon led to other vendors being invited; in a short time, an entire support industry sprang up to support the needs of a rapidly-growing Claus community: from custom costumers, to belt and boot makers, to reindeer ranchers.

In 2005, with so many guests traveling from around the country to attend the Sunday Luncheon, Connaghan began hosting a "Meet & Greet" on Saturday evening, and the following year some of their most experienced and expert Santas started offering formal training in the form of professional workshops and seminars during the day on Saturday—and the "Vendor Faire" became a two-day event.

By 2008, the AORBS mailing list had grown to more than 800, and leaders decided the time had come to form a 501(c)(7), so that they could begin offering tangible professional benefits. Their name was changed to the Fraternal Order of Real Bearded Santas, they began assessing annual dues, and a board of directors was formed.

In 2009, with H1N1 flu threatening that year's Christmas season, FORBS leaders struck a deal with the Centers for Disease Control and Prevention (CDC) to allow enough professional Santas to get early vaccinations that they were able to save nearly all major Christmas events.

For nearly three decades, the organization has maintained an unbroken historical thread to the original "casual lunch date"—to use their own vernacular, "We Pledge Allegiance To The Reunion Luncheon -- The Spring From Which Has Flowed The Entire, Modern Professional Santa World."

In 2019, FORBS celebrated its 25th anniversary with their Silver Jubilee Reunion.

In 2020, with the COVID-19 pandemic raging worldwide, FORBS again petitioned the CDC for early vaccinations; chairman Ric Erwin addressed the Advisory Committee on Immunization Practices on August 26. Simultaneously, FORBS launched Operation SANI-Claus, to provide members with free personal protective equipment, and to lead the industry in ways to safely serve the public during the holidays: some malls and shopping centers were encouraged to separate the guests from the performers using plexiglass shields, while others used chroma key (green-screen) technology to create family Santa pictures digitally. One of the most popular solutions was the "Santa Snow Globe", a plastic dome which spared parents from explaining public health concerns to children by simply claiming that Santa had been trapped in a snow globe by an elf magician's accident.

With the pandemic unabated in January 2021, FORBS conducted a Virtual Santa Reunion, inviting the nation's largest schools and booking agencies to participate and demonstrate the techniques that had been used to keep the public and the Claus community safe during the preceding Christmas season.

== Documentary films and television ==
The organization and its members are a popular recurring theme in the media:

- 2017 - Believe: The True Story of Real Bearded Santas - "A cinematic sleigh ride into the world of FORBS, the most exclusive & elite collection of Santas in the world".
- 2014 - I Am Santa Claus - A documentary of an entire year in the lives of five real-bearded professional Santa Clauses to find out what the rest of the year is like for a man who perpetually looks like Santa, featuring wrestler Mick Foley.
- 2011 - Becoming Santa - Hollywood producer Jack Sanderson documents his personal quest to become a professional Santa.
- 2010 - The Mentalist "Jolly Red Elf" - "The largest paid gathering of Santa performers in history"; CBI visits "Santa-palooza" to investigate the death of a professional Santa.
- 2008 - Scenes from a Mall - A Christmas episode of Public Radio Exchange's This American Life.
