= James Forbes, 17th Lord Forbes =

British Army general (1765–1843)

James Ochoncar Forbes, 17th Lord Forbes (1765–1843), was a Scottish soldier and peer. He was the eldest son of James Forbes, 16th Baron Forbes, by Catherine, only daughter of Sir Robert Innes, baronet, of Orton. The lands of Forbes, Aberdeenshire, still in their possession, have been held by this family since the reign of William the Lion (1165–1214).

== Military career ==
Forbes was born 17 March 1765. He entered the army as an ensign in the Coldstream Guards 13 June 1781, became lieutenant and captain 21 April 1786, captain and lieutenant-colonel 23 August 1793, colonel 3 May 1796, major-general 29 April 1802, lieutenant-general 27 March 1808, and general on 12 August 1819. He served in Flanders with his distinguished regiment, and was present in the battles and sieges of Raismes, Famars, Dunkirk, Lincelles, Tournay, &c. He subsequently accompanied the Helder Expedition, and was present in nearly every action which took place in that campaign. He was appointed second in command of the troops in the Mediterranean in March 1808, and in the same year sailed for Sicily. He was colonel 3rd Garrison Battalion 1807–9, 94th Foot 14 April 1809, 54th Foot 23 September 1809, and 21st Foot 1 June 1816 until his death. He was appointed Knight of the Order of Saint Januarius.

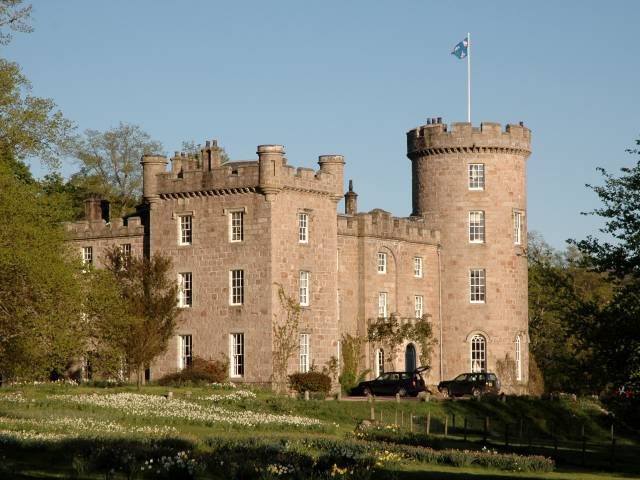
Castle Forbes, Aberdeenshire

== Castle Forbes ==
Forbes succeeded his father in the title in 1804, and was chosen a Scottish representative peer in 1806. In 1815 he commissioned the building of the present Castle Forbes, based on the previous house, to designs by architect Archibald Simpson.

== Private life ==
Forbes was from 1825 until 1830 Lord High Commissioner to the General Assembly of the Church of Scotland. He died 4 May 1843 at Bregenz, on Lake Constance, in his seventy-ninth year.

He had married at Crailing, 2 June 1792, Elizabeth, eldest daughter and heiress of Walter Hunter, esq., of Polmood, in the county of Peebles, and Crailing, in the county of Roxburgh, by the Lady Caroline Mackenzie, fourth daughter of the Earl of Cromartie, and had ten children.

His eldest son, the Hon. James Forbes, was an officer in the Coldstream Guards in the Peninsula and at Waterloo, but had predeceased his father in 1835. Lord Forbes was therefore succeeded by his second son, Walter Forbes, 18th Baron Forbes.

His daughter Charlotte Elizabeth married Sir John Forbes, 7th Baronet of Craigevar and Fintray (1785–1846)), and was the mother of William Forbes-Sempill, 17th Lord Sempill, and James Ochoncar Forbes, of Corse Castle.

Peerage of Scotland
Preceded by James Forbes	Lord Forbes; 1804-1843	Succeeded by Walter Forbes
Military offices
Preceded by William Gordon	Colonel of the 21st Regiment of Foot (Royal North British Fuzileers); 1816–1843	Succeeded by Sir Frederick Adam
Preceded by Edward Finch	Colonel of the 54th (West Norfolk) Regiment of Foot; 1809–1816	Succeeded by Isaac Gascoyne
