= Arthur C. Forbes =

English forester

- Born: 1866; Burnham, Buckinghamshire, England
- Died: 7 November 1950 (aged 83–84); Killiney, Dublin, Ireland
- Occupation: forester

Arthur Charles Forbes OBE (1866 – 7 November 1950) was an English forestry expert and the first Director of Forestry in the Irish Free State.

== Life ==
Forbes was born in Burnham, Buckinghamshire, the son of John Malcolm Forbes, a forester and farm bailiff. He died in Killiney on 7 November 1950.

Forbes was awarded a prize by the Worshipful Company of Carpenters for his essay The Adaptation of Land for Afforestation in 1904. He was a lecturer at Armstrong College of Science in Newcastle upon Tyne, and worked as forester on the Marquis of Bath’s Longleat Estate. Forbes migrated to Ireland in 1905 to enter the Irish Forestry Division in the Department of Agriculture and Technical Instruction. He undertook the training of foresters at the newly acquired Avondale in County Wicklow, developing the first Irish forestry and training centre. Along with John Crozier, Forbes oversaw the plantation of Ireland's first state forests.

He was appointed Assistant Forestry Commissioner for Ireland in 1919, and then the first Director of Forestry in 1922 under the new Department of Agriculture of the Irish Free State. He held that position until his retirement in 1931. During World War I he held the position of Timber Controller, for which he was appointed an OBE in 1920.

After his retirement, he was involved in the delivery of a degree in forestry in University College Dublin from 1931 to 1935.

He was described by Edward MacLysaght as "an Englishman, who is, by the way, devilish [sic] uninteresting outside the subject of forestry".

== Works ==
- 1904 English estate forestry London, E. Arnold
- 1910 The development of British forestry London, E. Arnold
- 'Some legendary and historical references to Irish woods and their significance', Proceedings of the Royal Irish Academy, 41 B (1932) 15–36.
