= Horace Forbes, 19th Lord Forbes =

Horace Courtenay Gammell Forbes, 19th Lord Forbes (24 February 1829 – 24 June 1914), was a Scottish peer.

Forbes was born in Aberdeen, Scotland in 1829 the second son of Walter Forbes, 18th Lord Forbes. He attended Oriel College, Oxford graduating with a BA in 1849, followed by an MA in 1851. He was for some time a master at Radley College prior to his father's death at which time he was referred to as Master of Forbes.

He was a Scottish representative peer to the House of Lords from 1868 to 1906 upon succeeding his father to the title.

He died in Dundee, by his own hand, and was succeeded in his title by his brother Atholl Monson Forbes. He was a staunch supporter of the Primrose League.

== Works ==
- Forbes, Horace Courtenay Gammell (1883). Shall we have a Channel tunnel? . Aberdeen: A. Brown & Co.

Peerage of Scotland
Preceded by Walter Forbes	Lord Forbes; 1868–1914	Succeeded by Atholl Monson Forbes
