= Lord Forbes =

Premier Lord of Scotland

- Creation date: circa 1436
- Created by: James II
- Peerage: Peerage of Scotland
- First holder: Alexander de Forbes
- Present holder: Malcolm Nigel Forbes, 23rd Lord Forbes
- Heir apparent: Geordie Malcolm Andrew Forbes
- Seats: Forbes Castle, Alford, Aberdeenshire

Lord Forbes is the senior Lordship of Parliament in the Peerage of Scotland.

The title was created sometime after 1436 for Alexander de Forbes, feudal baron of Forbes. The precise date of the creation is not known, but in a Precept dated July 12, 1442, he is already styled Lord Forbes. Brown's 1834 Peerage of Scotland gives a creation year of 1440. Alexander's descendant, the twelfth Lord, served as Lord Lieutenant of Aberdeenshire and Kincardineshire. His great-grandson, the seventeenth Lord, was a general in the Army and sat in the House of Lords as a Scottish representative peer from 1806 to 1843. His son, the eighteenth Lord, fought at the Battle of Waterloo in 1815.

He was succeeded by his son, the nineteenth Lord. He was a Scottish Representative Peer from 1874 to 1906. His nephew, the twenty-first Lord, served as a Scottish Representative Peer between 1917 and 1924. The latter's son, the twenty-second Lord, sat in the House of Lords as a Scottish Representative Peer from 1955 to 1963, when all Scottish peers were given an automatic seat in the House of Lords, and served in the Conservative administration of Harold Macmillan as Minister of State for Scotland from 1958 to 1959. The title is currently held by his son, Malcolm Nigel, the twenty-third Lord Forbes, who succeeded in 2013. Lord Forbes is Chief of Clan Forbes.

Hon. Patrick Forbes, third son of the second Lord Forbes, was the ancestor of both the Earls of Granard and the Forbes baronets of Craigievar. Also, the Lords Forbes of Pitsligo were descended from Sir William Forbes, brother of Alexander Forbes, 1st Lord Forbes.

The family seat is Castle Forbes near Alford, Aberdeenshire.

== Numbering matter ==
John Forbes (1570–1606), the elder surviving son of John Forbes, 8th Lord Forbes, became a friar and seemingly abandoned his claim to the Lordship. He died later in the same year (1606) as his father and there would be dispute over whether to count his brief succession in the numbering of Lordships. The question was most recently (As of 2023) settled in 1955, stating that he was not to be considered a Lord Forbes and his younger brother would be their father's immediate successor as Arthur Forbes, 9th Lord Forbes.

== Lords Forbes (c. 1444) ==
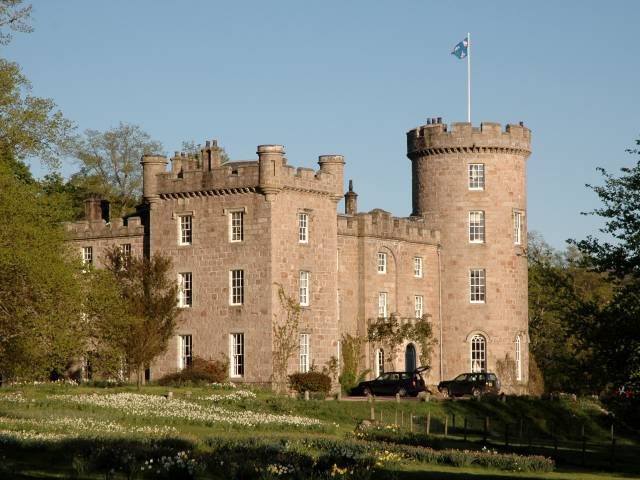
Castle Forbes, Aberdeenshire - the family seat

- 1st 1445–1448: Alexander Forbes (c. 1380–1448)
- 2nd 1448–c. 1461: James Forbes (d. 1462, son of 1st Lord)
- 3rd c. 1461–by 1488: William Forbes (d. 1483, son of 2nd Lord)
- 4th by 1488–c. 1491: Alexander Forbes (d. c. 1491, son of 3rd Lord)
- 5th c. 1491–c. 1496: Arthur Forbes (d. c. 1496, son of 3rd Lord)
- 6th c. 1496–1547: John Forbes (d. 1547, son of 3rd Lord)
- 7th 1547–1593: William Forbes (1513–1593, son of 6th Lord)
- 8th 1593–1606: John Forbes (1542–1606, son of 7th Lord)
- 9th 1606–after 1634 : Arthur Forbes (1581–1641, son of 8th Lord)
- 10th after 1634–1672: Alexander Forbes (1600–1672, son of 9th Lord) (m. Anne, daughter of John Lord Forbes of Pitsligo)
- 11th 1672–1697: William Forbes (d. 1697, son of 10th Lord & Anne)
- 12th 1697–1716: William Forbes (1656–1716, son of William, 11th Lord)
- 13th 1716–1730: William Forbes (d. 1730, son of 12th Lord)
- 14th 1730–1734: Francis Forbes (1721–1734, son of 13th Lord)
- 15th 1734–1761: James Forbes (1689–1761, 2nd son of William, 12th Lord) (m. Mary, daughter of Alexander, third Lord Forbes of Pitsligo)
- 16th 1761–1804: James Forbes (1725–1804, son of James, 15th Lord) (m. Catherine)
- 17th 1804–1843: James Ochoncar Forbes (1765–1843, son of 16th Lord and Catherine)
- 18th 1843–1868: Walter Forbes (1798–1868, son of 17th Lord)
- 19th 1868–1914: Horace Courtenay Gammell Forbes (1829–1914, elder son of Walter, 18th Lord)
- 20th 1914–1916: Atholl Monson Forbes (1841–1916, younger son of Walter, 18th Lord)
- 21st 1916–1953: Atholl Laurence Cunyngham (1882–1953, son of 20th Lord)
- 22nd 1953–2013: Nigel Ivan Forbes (1918–2013, son of 21st Lord)
- 23rd 2013–present: Malcolm Nigel Forbes (b. 1946, son of 22nd Lord)

The heir apparent is the present holder's grandson, Geordie Malcolm Andrew Forbes (b. 2010), styled Master of Forbes

== Family tree ==
Forbes family tree

John de Forbes
Lord Forbes, c. 1444
Alexander Forbes c. 1380–1448; 1st Lord Forbes c. 1444–1448
James Forbes d. 1462; 2nd Lord Forbes; 1448–c. 1461
William Forbes d. 1483; 3rd Lord Forbes c. 1461–by 1488	Duncan Forbes	Patrick Forbes
Alexander Forbes d. c. 1491; 4th Lord Forbes by 1488–c. 1491	Arthur Forbes d. c. 1496; 5th Lord Forbes c. 1491–c. 1496	John Forbes d. 1547; 6th Lord Forbes c. 1496–1547	Forbes, later Stuart-Forbes, of Monymusk	Forbes, of Castle Forbes
William Forbes; 1513–1593; 7th Lord Forbes; 1547–1593
John Forbes; 1542–1606; First called "Master of Forbes", then 8th Lord Forbes; 1593–1606	William Forbes of Corse Castle d. 1627
Forbes baronets, of Castle Forbes, 1628
William Forbes; 1563–1592	John Forbes; 1570–1606 "(9th) Lord Forbes"; 1606–1606; His brief lordship was disputed and retroactively discounted. (Note: The numbering dispute vacillated over the years and was most recently (As of 2023) settled in 2018.)	Arthur Forbes; 1581–1641; 9th Lord Forbes; 1606–after 1634	John Forbes 8th of Pitsligo d. 1625	William of Craigievar	Arthur Forbes d. 1632; 1st Baronet of Castle Forbes
Lord Forbes of Pitsligo, 1633	Forbes baronets, of Craigievar Castle, in the County of Aberdeen, 1630	Viscount Granard and Baron Clanehugh, 1675; Earl of Granard, 1684
Alexander Forbes; 1600–1672; 10th Lord Forbes after 1634–1672	Anne	Alexander Forbes d. 1636; 1st Lord Forbes of Pitsligo; 1633–1636	William Forbes, 1st Baronet d. 1648; 1st Baronet of Craigievar and Fintray; 1630–1648	Arthur Forbes; 1623–1695; 1st Earl of Granard, etc., 2nd Baronet of Castle Forbes
William Forbes d. 1697; 11th Lord Forbes after 1672–1697	John Forbes of Moneymusk d. c. 1713; 3rd Baronet of Monymusk	Alexander Forbes d. 1690; 2nd Lord Forbes of Pitsligo; 1636–1690	Alexander Forbes of Foveran d. 1697	John Forbes, 2nd Baronet ("Red Sir John"); 1636–1703; 2nd Baronet of Craigievar and Fintray; 1648–1703	Arthur Forbes c. 1656–1734; 2nd Earl of Granard, etc., 3rd Baronet of Castle Forbes
William Forbes; 1656–1716; 12th Lord Forbes; 1697–1716	William Forbes of Monymusk; 4th Baronet of Monymusk	John Forbes b. 1680	Alexander Forbes c. 1655–1690; 3rd Lord Forbes of Pitsligo; 1690–1690	Samuel Forbes, 1st Baronet; 1653–1717; 1st Baronet of Foveran	John Forbes, of Knaperna	William Forbes, 3rd Baronet; 1660–c. 1730; 3rd Baronet of Craigievar and Fintray; 1703–c. 1730	George Forbes; 1685–1765; 3rd Earl of Granard, etc., 4th Baronet of Castle Forbes
William Forbes d. 1730; 13th Lord Forbes; 1716–1730	James Forbes; 1689–1761; 15th Lord Forbes; 1734–1761	Mary Forbes	John Forbes d. 1715	Alexander Forbes; 1678–1762; 4th Lord Forbes of Pitsligo; 1691–1748	William Forbes	Alexander Forbes, 2nd Baronet d. before 1755; 2nd Baronet of Foveran	Samuel Forbes, of Knaperna	Arthur Forbes; 1709–1773; 4th Baronet of Craigievar and Fintray c. 1730–1773	George Forbes; 1710–1769; 4th Earl of Granard, etc., 5th Baronet of Castle Forbes
Lordship Forbes of Pitsligo attainted, 1748
Francis Forbes; 1721–1734; 14th Lord Forbes; 1730–1734	James Forbes c. 1725–1804; 16th Lord Forbes; 1761–1804	William Forbes d. 1743; 5th Baronet of Monymusk; 1715–1743	Christian Forbes; 1705–1789	Forbes Baronets of Newe in the County of Aberdeen Charles Forbes; 1774–1849; 1st Baronet of Newe; 1823–1849	John Forbes d. c. 1760; 3rd Baronet of Knaperna	George Forbes; 1740–1780; 5th Earl of Granard, etc., 6th Baronet of Castle Forbes
Baronetcy of Foveran/Knaperna dormant, c. 1760
Baron Granard (UK), 1806
James Ochoncar Forbes; 1765–1843; 17th Lord Forbes; 1804–1843	William Forbes; 1739–1806; 6th Baronet of Monymusk, and later Pitsligo; 1743–1806	William Forbes; 1755–1816; 5th Baronet of Craigievar and Fintray; 1773–1816	George Forbes; 1760–1837; 6th Earl of Granard, etc., 1st Baron Granard, 7th Baronet of Castle Forbes
Walter Gammell Forbes; 1798–1868; 18th Lord Forbes; 1843–1868	Charlotte Elizabeth	William Forbes; 1773–1828; 7th Baronet of Monymusk; 1806–1828 [m. Williamina, daughter of Sir John Stuart/Belshes/Belshes-Wishart (3rd Baronet (S. 1707) of Fettercairn co. Kincardine]	Arthur Forbes, 6th Baronet; 1784–1823; 6th Baronet of Craigievar and Fintray; 1816–1823	John Forbes, 7th Baronet; 1785–1846; 7th Baronet of Craigievar and Fintray; 1823–1846	George Forbes; 1785–1836 styled Viscount Forbes
John Stuart Hepburn Forbes; 1804–1866; 8th Baronet of Monymusk, and later of Invermay and Balmanno; 1828–1866 [Inherited Invermay and Balmanno as heir and cousin of Alexander Hepburn-Murray-Belshes d. 1864]	Charles Hay Forbes; 1806–1859	William Forbes-Sempill; 1836–1905; 17th Lord Sempill; 1884–1905; 8th Baronet of Craigievar and Fintray; 1846–1905 (married Carlone Louisa, daughter of Charles Forbes, 3rd Baronet of Newe)	James Ochoncar Forbes; 1837–1900	George Arthur Hastings Forbes; 1833–1889; 7th Earl of Granard, etc., 2nd Baron Granard, 8th Baronet of Castle Forbes
Horace Courtenay Gammell Forbes; 1829–1914; 19th Lord Forbes; 1868–1914	Atholl Monson Forbes; 1841–1916; 20th Lord Forbes; 1914–1916	William Forbes; 1835–1906; 9th Baronet of Monymusk, Invermay, and Balmanno; 1866–1906	John Forbes-Sempill; 1863–1934; 18th Lord Sempill, 9th Baronet of Craigievar and Fintray; 1905–1934	Arthur Lionel Ochoncar Forbes-Sempill; 1877–1962	James Ochoncar Forbes; 1867–1945	Bernard Arthur William Patrick Hastings Forbes; 1874–1948; 8th Earl of Granard, etc., 3rd Baron Granard, 9th Baronet of Castle Forbes
Atholl Laurence Cunyngham; 1882–1953; 21st Lord Forbes; 1916–1953	Charles Hay Hepburn Stuart-Forbes of Pitsligo; 1871–1921; 10th Baronet of Monymusk, Invermay, and Balmanno; 1906–1921	William Francis Forbes-Sempill; 1893–1965; 19th Lord Sempill, 10th Baronet of Craigievar and Fintray; 1934–1965
Nigel Ivan Forbes; 1918–2013; 22nd Lord Forbes; 1953–2013	Ann Forbes-Sempill; 1920–1995; 20th Lady Sempill	Ewan Forbes; 1912–1991; 11th Baronet of Craigievar and Fintray; 1965–1991	John Alexander Cumnock Forbes; 1927–2000; 12th Baronet of Craigievar and Fintray; 1991–2000	Patrick Walter Forbes; 1914–1979	Arthur Patrick Hastings Forbes; 1915–1992; 9th Earl of Granard, etc., 4th Baron Granard, 10th Baronet of Castle Forbes	John Forbes; 1920–1982
Malcolm Nigel Forbes b. 1946; 23rd Lord Forbes since 2013	James Sempill b. 1949; 21st Lord Sempill	Andrew Iain Ochoncar Forbes; 1945–2003; 13th Baronet of Craigievar and Fintray; 2000–2003	Peter Arthur Edward Hastings Forbes b. 1957; 10th Earl of Granard, etc., 5th Baron Granard, 11th Baronet of Castle Forbes
Francis Henry William Sempill b. 1979 styled Master of Sempill	James Patrick Ochoncar Forbes b. 1986; 14th Baronet of Craigievar and Fintray since 2003	David Ian Ochoncar Forbes b. 1993; Heir presumptive to the Baronetage of Craigievar and Fintray	Jonathan Peter Hastings Forbes b. 1981 styled Viscount Forbes

== See also ==
- Clan Forbes
- Earl of Granard
- Lord Forbes of Pitsligo
- Forbes baronets
