= Newtown Forbes =

Village in County Longford, Ireland

Newtown Forbes Irish: An Lios Breac
- Village
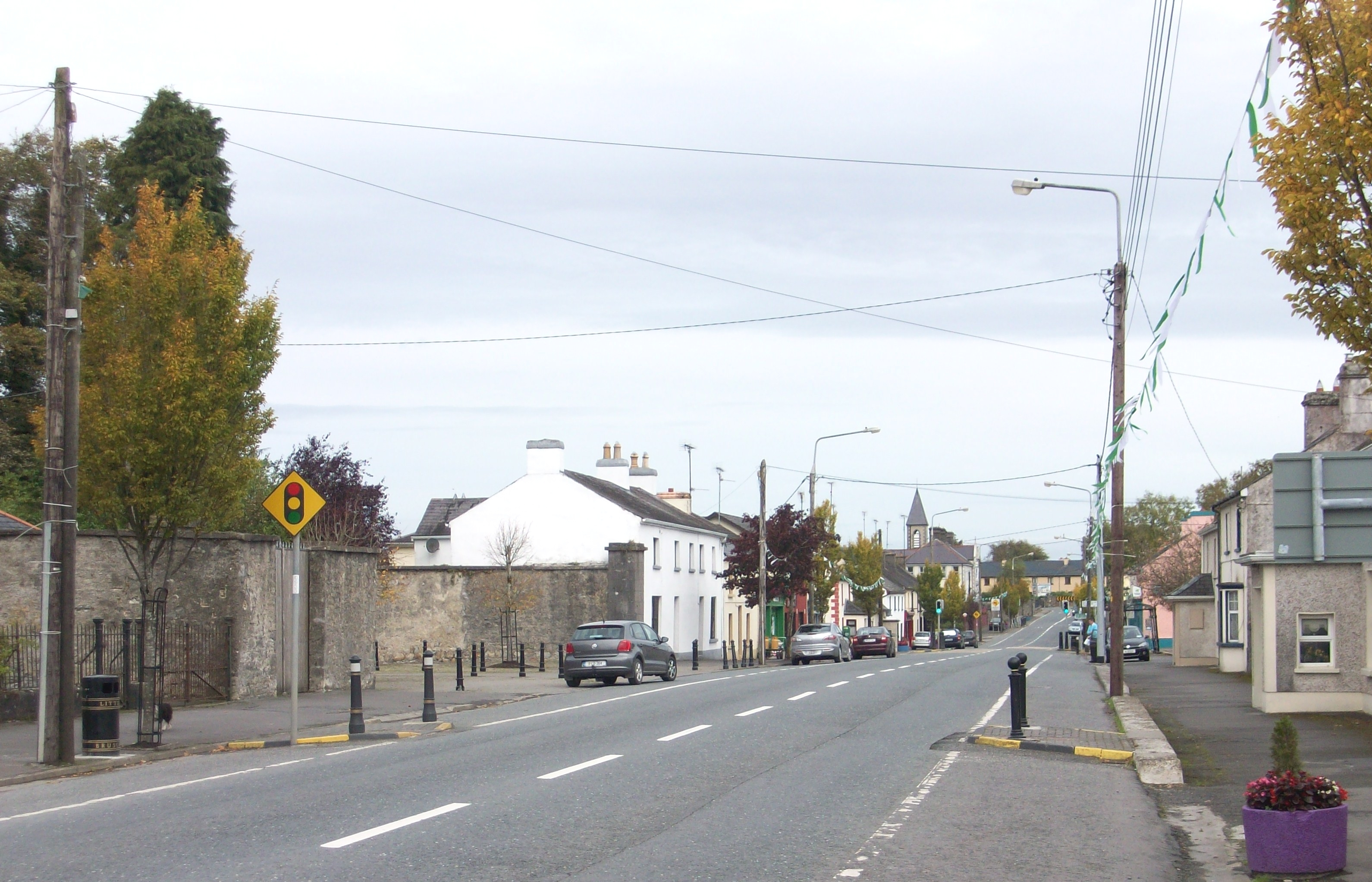
- Newtownforbes main street in 2011

- Location in Ireland
- Coordinates: 53.767938°N 7.833618°W
- Country: Ireland
- Province: Leinster
- County: County Longford
- Elevation: 60 m (200 ft)

Population (2022)
  - Total: 851
- Irish Grid Reference: N107795

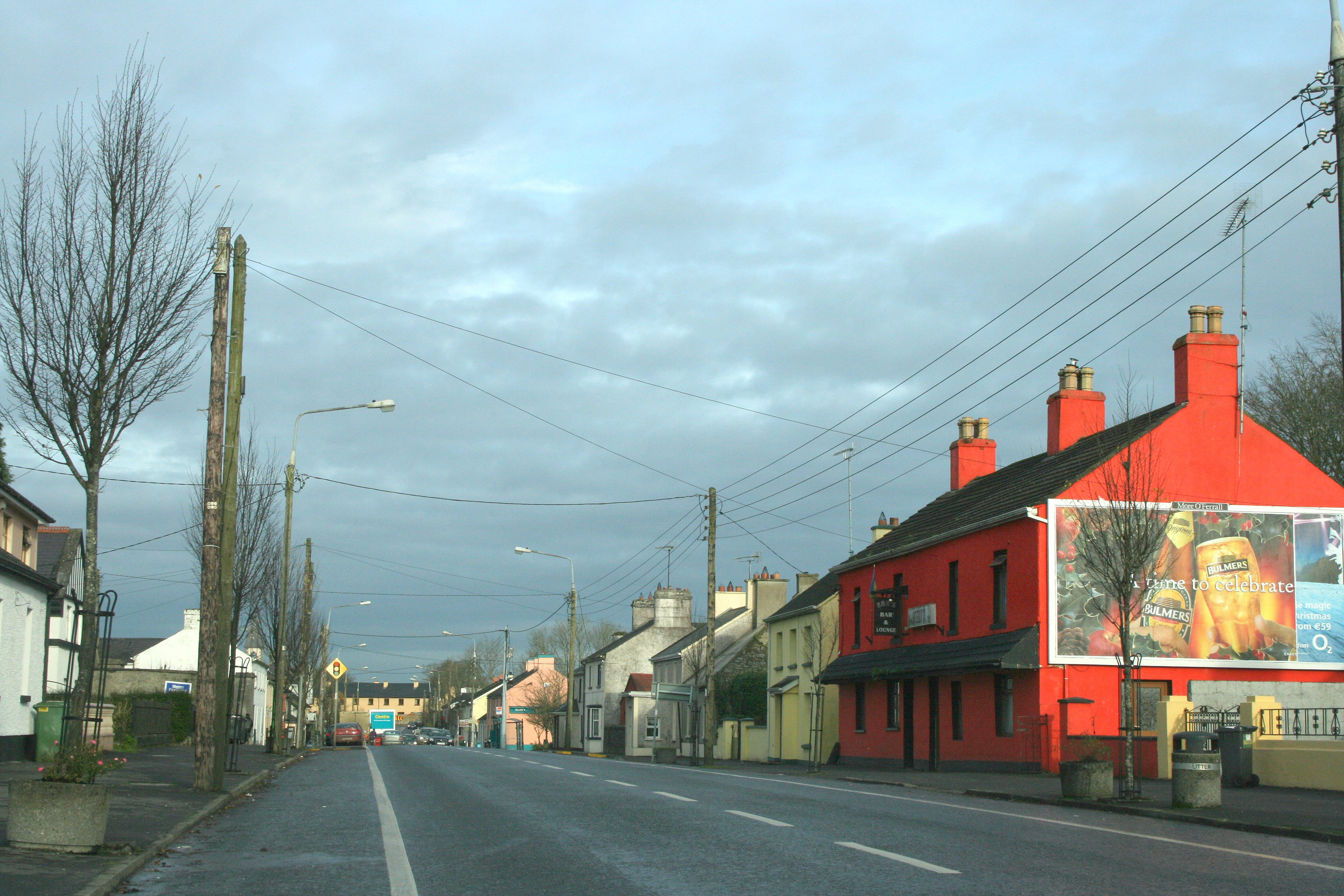
Newtownforbes in 2007

Newtown Forbes, historically called Lisbrack (Irish: an Lios Breac, meaning 'the speckled ringfort'), is a large village in County Longford, Ireland. It is on the N4 road, 6 km (4 miles) northwest of Longford town. As of the 2022 census, Newtownforbes had a population of 851 people. The village is in the parish of Clonguish.

Newtown Forbes was founded during the 17th century Plantations of Ireland and re-named after the Forbes family; wealthy colonists and members of the British nobility, who dwelt at Castle Forbes.

== History ==
Newtown Forbes takes its name from the Forbes family, who originated in Aberdeenshire in Scotland and were British Royalists. Around 1621, during the Plantations of Ireland, British captain Sir Arthur Forbes was granted land confiscated from the native Irish and was made baronet. His son, Arthur Forbes, was made Earl of Granard and Earl Marshal of Ireland under the Crown. During the Williamite War, he fought on the side of the Williamites. The Forbes family have been resident in Castleforbes since 1691. The family changed the name of the village from Lisbrack to Newtown Forbes around 1750. Many of the houses in the original part of the village date from the late nineteenth and early twentieth centuries.

One of the two pubs in the town, Casey's Public House, was the last pub in the Midlands to stop the practise of bottling Guinness for the brewery and labelling it.

== Heritage and culture ==
=== Castle Forbes ===
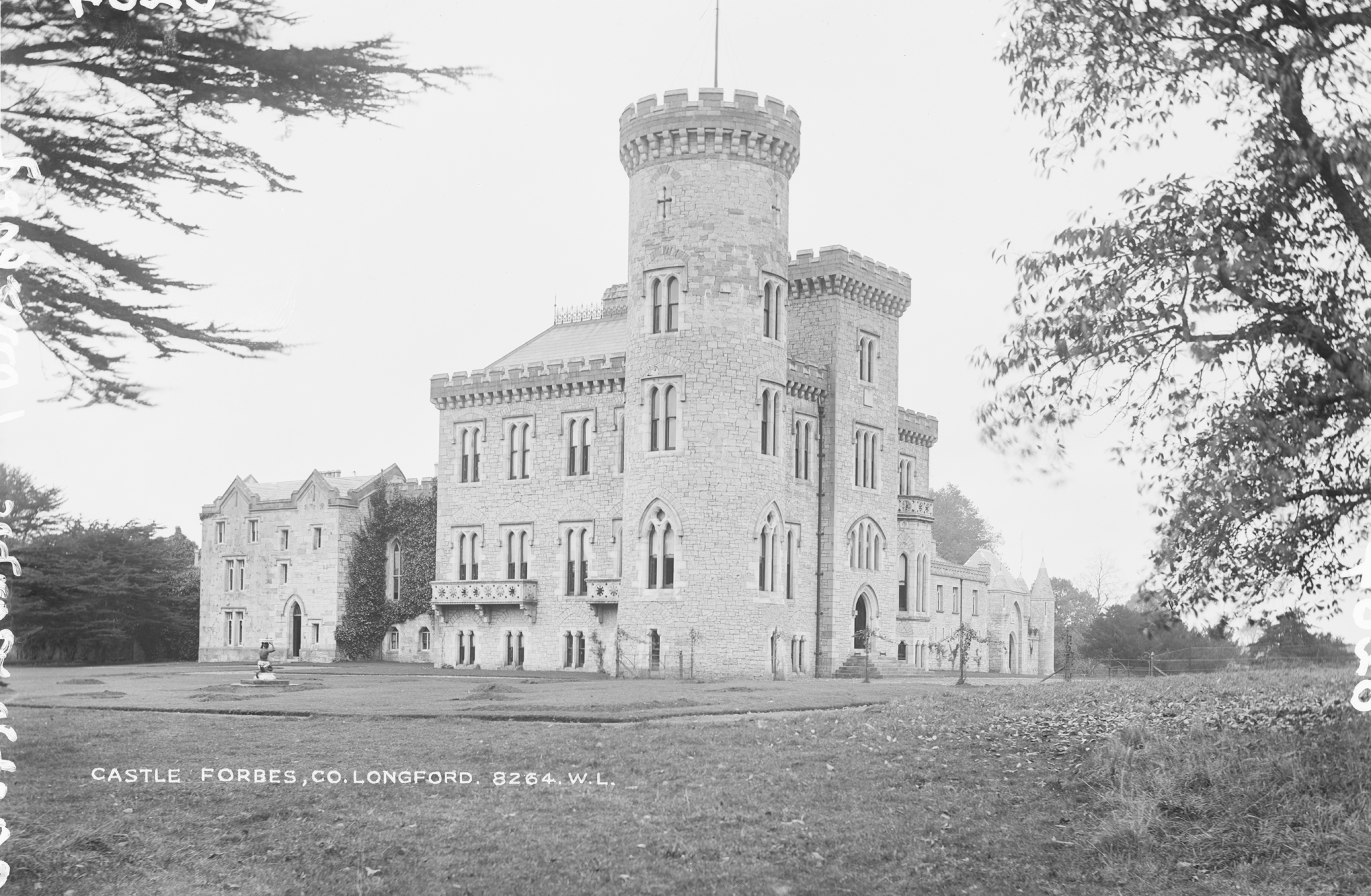
Castle Forbes

Castle Forbes is situated about 5 km (3 miles) from Longford town and stands between Newtownforbes and Lough Forbes on the River Shannon. The castle and grounds are owned by the 10th Earl of Granard and thus are private, with strictly no public access.

==== History of Castle Forbes ====
Built to the design of John Hargrave from Cork, Castle Forbes, located in the townland of Castleforbes (all one word), is a 19th-century structure of cut limestone. The entrance gateway of the castle is French style, which is about one mile (1.6 km) from the castle itself. There are some narrow windows in the shape of an arch as well as the remains of some English style windows.

In 1909, following the marriage of the 8th Earl of Granard to Beatrice, daughter of the wealthy Ogden Mills of Staatsburg, New York, the decoration of Castle Forbes was completed. Lady Jane structured the original building of Castle Forbes in 1624. Over the years, the castle has been added to. In 1825, the castle was partly burned. It was saved by a dog called 'Pilot' whose barking woke everyone in the castle.

1,286 acres (5.20 km^{2}) of land was given to them in 1619. In 1854, together the castle covered 1,346 acres (5.45 km^{2}) of land within its demesne. It was the largest demesne in County Longford. In 1876, the total estate, including parts of land from around the parish, Clonguish, Drumlish, Killashee and near Mullingar, covered 14,978 acres (60.61 km^{2}) of land. Today, Lady Georgina, the present owner, owns only the land within the demesne, 1,346 acres (5.45 km^{2}).

In 1911, the castle was the site of the introduction to Ireland of the Eastern grey squirrel (Sciurus carolinensis), when six pairs were given as a wedding gift to Lord Forbes and some later escaped into the wild.

==== Castleforbes airfield ====
The airfield, code EICS, was constructed in 1975 on the estate with a 1,275-metre grass runway being installed for the 9th Earl of Granard for his use and invited friends. Following his death in 1992, the airfield's licence was revoked, and it closed.

=== St Paul's Church of Ireland Church ===
This church was built or re-built in 1829 to a cruciform plan and is situated on Main Street. A particularly notable feature is the box pews with fielded panels, which are believed to be the last remaining examples in Ireland.

=== St Mary's Catholic Church ===
This church was built on lands provided by the Forbes family. It was built by J.J. McCarthy in a standardised gothic style. A separate entrance was originally provided for the Forbes family. Following some structural issues with the church, the roof was lowered and the internal arcades removed. The church was restored in May 1950. One feature of the renovation is the new west windows by Joe Sheridan of Kilkenny, which show the Virgin Mary with Jesus and St. John and a playfriend. It also shows St. Elither, a local saint, building the first Christian church of the village. In the 21st century, the church was renovated with a new window in the west facade showing St. Barry teaching the children.

== Transport ==
=== Rail ===
The nearest railway station today is Longford. Although the railway passes through Newtownforbes, trains no longer stop in the village.

==== Newtownforbes railway station ====
Originally built by the Midland and Great Western Railway Company c. 1860 to serve the Mullingar to Sligo line, the station was closed in 1963. It was probably built to designs by George Wilkinson (1814–1890), a noted architect of his day who also completed the designs for a number of other railway stations for The Midland and Great Western Railway Company (on the Mullingar to Longford and the Inny Junction to Cavan lines) at this time. It remains an important component of the architectural and industrial heritage of County Longford (on the Mullingar to Longford and the Inny Junction to Cavan lines) at this time

=== Bus ===
The Bus Éireann service from Sligo to Dublin and Dublin airport stops in Newtownforbes with approximately 5 services each way, one of which is overnight. Journeytime to Dublin is typically under 3 hours.

Local Link route LR12 has a bus on Friday to/from Longford town as at 2024.

== Sport ==
The local Gaelic Athletic Association (GAA) club in Newtownforbes is Clonguish GAA, which was founded in 1889. The club play Gaelic football and hurling, the latter known as Clonguish Gaels. Their games are played in the Bertie Allen Park, which is located in the village. The club has won 12 Longford Senior Football Championship titles and 6 Longford Senior Hurling Championship titles.

== Education ==
The local national (primary) school is Scoil Mhuire. The village has a Catholic church, St. Mary's, which

== Notable people ==
- Paul Barden, Gaelic footballer

== See also ==
- List of towns and villages in Ireland
