= George Forbes, 7th Earl of Granard =

Irish peer and soldier (1833–1889)

The Right Honourable George Forbes KP
- Earl of Granard
- Coat of arms
- Tenure: 1837–1889
- Predecessor: George Forbes, 6th Earl of Granard
- Successor: Bernard Forbes, 8th Earl of Granard
- Full name: George Arthur Hastings Forbes
- Born: 5 August 1833
- Died: 25 August 1889 (aged 56)
- Spouses: Jane Colclough Grogan Morgan (m. 1858) Hon. Frances Mary Petre (m. 1873)
- Issue: With Jane Morgan: Lady Adelaide Forbes; Lady Sophia Forbes; With Hon. France Petrie: Lady Margaret Forbes; Bernard Forbes, 8th Earl of Granard; Hon. Fergus Forbes; Capt. Hon. Reginald Forbes; Lady Eva Forbes; Col. Hon. Donald Forbes; Lt-Col. Hon. Bertram Forbes; Cap. Hon. Fergus Forbes
- Father: George Forbes, Viscount Forbes
- Mother: Frances Mary Territt

George Arthur Hastings Forbes, 7th Earl of Granard KP (5 August 1833 – 25 August 1889), styled Viscount Forbes from 1836 to 1837, was an Irish peer and militia officer.

== Background and education ==
He was the son of Major-General George Forbes, Viscount Forbes, and his wife, the Viscountess Forbes (née Frances Mary Territt); he succeeded his grandfather, George Forbes, 6th Earl of Granard, as the 7th Earl of Granard in 1837. From his mother's second marriage to Thomas Nugent Vaughan, he had a younger half-sister, Angela Frances Mary Vaughan, who married Sir Frederick FitzWygram, 4th Baronet. He was educated at Eton.

He owned 21,000 acres in Longford, Leitrim and Wexford.

== Military career ==
Granard was appointed Lieutenant-Colonel commandant of the Westmeath Rifle Militia on 26 December 1855. He was granted the honorary rank of Colonel on 29 May 1878. The regiment became the 9th (Westmeath Militia) Battalion, Rifle Brigade, in 1881. He was made a Knight of St Patrick in 1857.

Granard was President of the British Association of the Sovereign Military Order of Malta from 1875 until his death, and was made a Knight Grand Cross of the Papal Order of St. Gregory the Great. He was also a member of the Senate of the Royal University of Ireland. Lord and Lady Granard converted to Roman Catholicism in 1869.

== Family ==
By his first marriage to Jane Colclough Grogan Morgan on 2 June 1858, Granard had two daughters:

- Lady Adelaide Jane Frances Forbes (21 August 1860 – 18 November 1942); married Lord Maurice FitzGerald. She was the last private occupant of Johnstown Castle.
- Lady Sophia Maria Elizabeth Forbes (21 Jan 1862 – 7 November 1942), married Sir Henry Grattan-Bellew, 3rd Baronet.

By his second marriage to the Honourable Frances Mary Petre, daughter of William Petre, 12th Baron Petre, on 4 September 1873, he had eight children:

- Lady Margaret Mary Theresa Forbes (died 19 May 1965), married Capt. Hon. George Savile, son of John Savile, 4th Earl of Mexborough
- Bernard Arthur William Patrick Hastings Forbes, 8th Earl of Granard (1874–1948)
- Hon. Fergus Reginald George Forbes (20 January 1876 – 18 February 1876)
- Capt. Hon. Reginald George Benedict Forbes (25 June 1877 – 20 May 1908)
- Lady Eva Mary Margaret Forbes (1877–1968); owned the racehorse Kilbarry, which won the Irish Grand National in 1924.
- Col. Hon. Donald Alexander Forbes (3 September 1880 – 2 August 1938), married Mary Doreen Lawson and had issue
- Lt.-Col. Hon. Bertram Aloysius Forbes (26 May 1882 – 5 August 1960)
- Capt. Hon. Fergus George Arthur Forbes (26 May 1882 – 23 August 1914), killed in World War I

== Coat of arms ==
Coat of arms of George Forbes, 7th Earl of Granard
Coronet A coronet of an Earl Crest Azure three Bears' Heads couped Argent muzzled Gules. Escutcheon A Bear statant Argent guttée de sang muzzled Gules. Supporters Dexter: an Unicorn Erminois armed maned tufted and unguled Or; Sinister: a Dragon wings expanded Ermine. Motto Fax Mentis Incendium Gloriae (The incitement to glory is the firebrand of the mind)

Honorary titles
Preceded by Edward King Tenison	Lord Lieutenant of Leitrim; 1856–1872	Succeeded by The Viscount Southwell
Peerage of Ireland
Preceded by George Forbes	Earl of Granard; 1837–1889	Succeeded by Bernard Forbes
