= Arthur Forbes, 1st Earl of Granard =

Irish Royalist soldier

Arthur Forbes, 1st Earl of Granard (1623–1696) was an Irish Royalist soldier of Scottish descent. He held the position Marshal of Ireland, commander of the Royal Irish Army during the reign of Charles II. A supporter of the Glorious Revolution, he fought on the Williamite side during the War of the Two Kings.

== Early life ==
Forbes was the eldest son of Sir Arthur Forbes of Corse Castle and Castle Forbes in Aberdeenshire; who went to Ireland in 1620 with the Master of Forbes's regiment, of which he was lieutenant-colonel, and was granted large estates in counties Leitrim and Longford by King James I. His mother was Jane, daughter of Sir Robert Lauder of the Isle of Bass, and widow of Sir Alexander Hamilton of Killeshandra, County Cavan. His father was killed in a duel in 1632, and he was brought up by his mother.

== Career ==
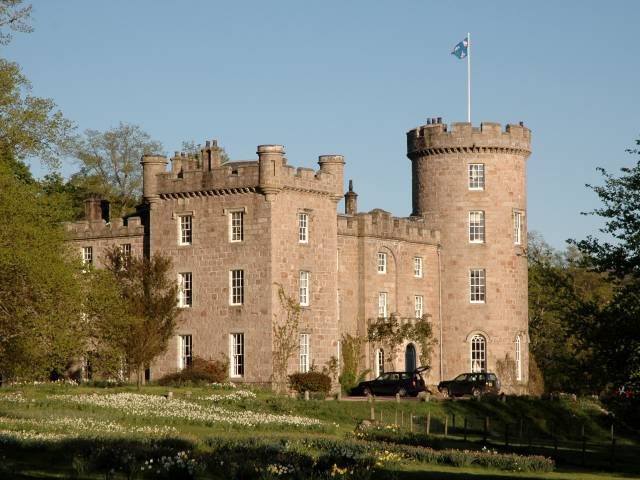
Castle Forbes

=== English Civil War ===
During the rebellion of 1641 Jane Forbes was besieged in Castle Forbes, the family seat, for nine months, and Forbes raised men for her relief, though only eighteen years old. He is next heard of in Scotland, serving under James Graham, 1st Marquess of Montrose in the cause of King Charles I. On the defeat of Montrose in 1645, Forbes was taken prisoner, and for two years he was confined in Edinburgh Castle.

On his release, he made efforts to restore the Stuarts, and then returned to Ireland in 1655.

=== Under Charles II ===
In 1660 he was sent to Charles at Breda to assure him that if he would only go over to Ireland the whole kingdom would declare for him. At the Restoration he was appointed a commissioner of the court of claims in Ireland, and received additional grants of land in Westmeath. In 1661 he entered the Irish House of Commons as member for County Tyrone.

In 1663 he did service to the king in the north of Ireland by nipping in the bud efforts there in support of Thomas Blood's plot. Honours then came his way. In 1670 he was sworn of the Privy Council of Ireland, and appointed marshal and commander-in-chief of the army. In 1671 he was one of the Lord Justices (Ireland); on several subsequent occasions, he held the post.

In 1672 he helped the Presbyterian Church of Ireland, of which he was a member, by procuring for it the first grant of regium donum, which the church continued to enjoy until the passing of the Irish Church Act in 1869, with the exception of a short interval. James Kirkpatrick, in his Essay Upon the Loyalty of Presbyterians (1713), gave an account of Forbes's lobbying.

In 1675 he was created Baron Clanehugh and Viscount Granard. In 1684 he raised the 18th Regiment of Foot, was made colonel thereof, and in the same year was advanced to the dignity of Earl of Granard.

=== Under James II ===
James II endeavoured to make use of Granard; but he was not pliable, and was removed from the command of the army, Richard Talbot, 1st Earl of Tyrconnell being put in his place. When James's Dublin parliament passed the acts of repeal and attainder, he remonstrated with the king. Finding his arguments vain, he went to the House of Lords, entered his protest against the measures, and retired to Castle Forbes. Here he was unsuccessfully besieged by Irish forces.

=== Williamite War ===
When William III went over to Ireland, Granard replaced John Mitchelburne in command of a force of five thousand men for the reduction of Sligo, the surrender of which he secured. This was his last public service.

== Personal life ==
He married Catherine Stewart (née Newcomen), daughter of Sir Robert Newcomen of Mosstown, co. Longford, and widow of Sir Alexander Stewart, ancestor of the Mountjoy family. Together, they had five sons and one daughter, including:

- Arthur Forbes, 2nd Earl of Granard (c. 1656–1734), who married Mary Rawdon, daughter of Sir George Rawdon, 1st Baronet and Hon. Dorothy Conway (a daughter of the 2nd Viscount Conway), in 1678.
- Hon. Robert Forbes (d. 1686), who was killed at the Siege of Buda.
- Lady Catherine Forbes (d. 1743), who married Arthur Chichester, 3rd Earl of Donegall.

His closing years were spent quietly at Castle Forbes, where he died in 1696. He was succeeded by his eldest son Arthur, 2nd Earl of Granard.

== Coat of arms ==
Coat of arms of Arthur Forbes, 1st Earl of Granard
| Coronet A coronet of an Earl Crest Azure three Bears' Heads couped Argent muzzled Gules. Escutcheon A Bear statant Argent guttée de sang muzzled Gules. Supporters Dexter: an Unicorn Erminois armed maned tufted and unguled Or; Sinister: a Dragon wings expanded Ermine. Motto Fax Mentis Incendium Gloriae (The incitement to glory is the firebrand of the mind) |

Peerage of Ireland
| New creation | Earl of Granard; 1684–1696 | Succeeded by Arthur Forbes |
| New creation | Viscount Granard; 1675–1696 | Succeeded by Arthur Forbes |
Baronetage of Nova Scotia
| Preceded by Arthur Forbes | Baronet (of Castle Forbes); 1632–1696 | Succeeded by Arthur Forbes |
