= Alexander Forbes, 1st Lord Forbes =

Alexander de Forbes, 1st Lord Forbes (c. 1380–1448), also feudal baron of Forbes, was a Scottish nobleman.

== Life ==
He was the eldest son of Sir John de Forbes (died 1405), Sheriff-depute of Aberdeen, and Coroner of that shire, by his wife, Margaret, a daughter of Sir John Kennedy of Dunure and Mary de Montgomery of Stair and Cassillis.

Alexander de Forbes fought at the Battle of Harlaw in 1411, and appears among the Scottish forces sent to the assistance of Charles, Dauphin of France, afterwards King Charles VII, and had a share in the victory obtained over the English at Beaugé, in Anjou, on 22 March 1421. But soon after, at the desire of King James I of Scotland, then a prisoner in England, Forbes quit the French service and subsequently obtained three Safe-conducts at different times to visit England, with one hundred persons in his retinue each time, to wait upon his sovereign.

He was created a Lord of Parliament sometime after 1436. The precise date of the peerage creation is not known (although Brown gives 1440), but in a Precept, dated 12 July 1442, he is already styled Lord Forbes.

== Family ==
The first Lord Forbes married Lady Elizabeth (or Mary), only daughter of George Douglas, 1st Earl of Angus, a granddaughter of King Robert III of Scotland, by whom he had two sons and three daughters. He was succeeded by his eldest son:

- James Forbes, 2nd Lord Forbes (died circa 1460)

Peerage of Scotland
New creation	Lord Forbes c. 1444–1448	Succeeded by James Forbes
