= Robert Pierce Forbes =

American historian

Robert Pierce Forbes (born April 27, 1958) is an American historian specializing in the politics and culture of the early American Republic, and the impact of slavery on the development of American institutions and modern society.

== Life ==
Robert Pierce Forbes was born in Boston, Massachusetts, the elder son of Henry Ashton Crosby Forbes and Grace Pierce Forbes. His childhood was spent in Cambridge, Massachusetts, where he attended Shady Hill School. His father was a historian of Asian decorative arts, founder of the Captain Robert Bennet Forbes House and curator of Asian export art at the Peabody Essex Museum in Salem, Massachusetts. His mother was a book editor and homemaker.

Forbes attended Concord Academy and graduated from the Cambridge High and Latin School (now Cambridge Rindge and Latin School) in 1976. He received his bachelor's degree in history from the Columbian College of Arts and Sciences of The George Washington University in 1986, receiving its Distinguished Scholar Award. After graduation he worked at the Afro-American Communities Project at the Smithsonian's National Museum of American History before enrolling in the graduate program in history at Yale University, where he received a Ph.D in 1994.

From 1998 to 2006, Forbes served as the founding associate director of Yale's Gilder Lehrman Center for the Study of Slavery, Resistance, and Abolition, under the directorship of David Brion Davis. During this time he also taught undergraduate and graduate courses at Yale. Between 2006 and 2014, Forbes taught U.S. history and American Studies at the University of Connecticut, Torrington. Professor Forbes is also the founder of Locally Grown History, an initiative founded in 2008 to promote public history and tourism in northwest Connecticut. Since 2017, he has taught at Southern Connecticut State University.

In 2022, Forbes edited and annotated Notes on the State of Virginia by Thomas Jefferson (New Haven: Yale University Press), the first version to employ the original 1785 Paris edition and Jefferson's manuscript. His first book, The Missouri Compromise and its Aftermath: Slavery and the Meaning of America, the first major work on the subject in over fifty years, was described as "a profound study" by Oxford historian Daniel Walker Howe. Forbes is also the author of two essays on the cultural history of slavery, "Slavery and the Evangelical Enlightenment", in McKivigan and Snay, eds., Religion and the Antebellum Debate over Slavery (Athens: University of Georgia Press, 1998) and "'Truth Systematised': The Changing Debate over Slavery and Abolition, 1761-1916", in McCarthy and Stauffer, eds., Prophets of Protest: Reconsidering the History of American Abolitionism (New York: The New Press, 2006).

In 2007, Forbes was an advising scholar for the PBS-documentary Prince Among Slaves.

== Books ==
- Robert Pierce Forbes (2007). The Missouri Compromise and its Aftermath: Slavery and the Meaning of America. University of North Carolina Press. ISBN 978-0-8078-3105-2.
- Robert Pierce Forbes; Karen Clemens Kernan; John Devereaux Kernan (2001). Francis Kernan: The Life and Times of a 19th-century Citizen-Politician of Upstate New York. Oneida County Historical Society. ISBN 978-0-9668178-1-2.

=== Chapters in Anthologies ===
- Robert Forbes (2015). "We Here Highly Resolve: The End of Compromise and the Return to Revolutionary Time". In Sean Conant (ed.). Conceived in Liberty: Perspectives on Lincoln at Gettysburg. Oxford University Press.
- Robert Forbes (2009). "The Missouri Compromise and Sectionalism". In Paul Finkelman; Donald R. Kennon (eds.). Congress and the Emergence of Sectionalism: From the Missouri Compromise to the Age of Jackson. Ohio University Press. ISBN 978-1-56584-880-1.
- Robert Forbes (2006). "'Truth Systematised': The Changing Debate over Slavery and Abolition, 1761-1916". In Timothy Patrick McCarthy; John Stauffer (eds.). Prophets of Protest: Reconsidering the History of American Abolitionism. The New Press. ISBN 978-1-56584-880-1.
- Robert Forbes (1998). "Slavery and the Evangelical Enlightenment". In John R. McKivigan; Mitchell Snay (eds.). Religion and the Antebellum Debate over Slavery. University of Georgia Press. ISBN 0-8203-1972-4.
