= Alexander Forbes, 4th Lord Forbes =

Alexander Forbes, 4th Lord Forbes (died 1491), was the eldest son of William, 3rd Lord Forbes, and succeeded his father in or before 1483.

The gift of the fine payable to the crown on his marriage was acquired by Margaret, Lady Dirleton, who wished him to marry her own daughter, Margaret Ker. But he declined her proposals, and without her consent married Lady Margaret Boyd, daughter of Thomas Boyd, Earl of Arran. For this he was condemned by the lords auditors on 5 July 1483 to pay Lady Dirleton double the value of his marriage or two thousand merks.

He espoused the cause of James III when the son of that monarch rose in rebellion in 1488 against him. After the king's death at Sauchieburn he was summoned to answer before parliament to a charge of treason and conspiracy, but instead of obeying the summons he exposed the blood-stained shirt of the slain king on his spear at Aberdeen, and raised a considerable force there with the object of avenging his death. But his hopes of success were suddenly extinguished by the defeat of the Earl of Lennox (with whom he had been acting in concert) at Tillymoor, near Stirling, and on submitting to James IV, he was pardoned and received into favour.

He died about 1491, survived by his widow, who was a granddaughter of James II, and who in 1509 married David, Lord Kennedy, later 1st first Earl of Cassilis, but leaving no issue. He was succeeded by his two brothers, Arthur, 5th lord, and John, 6th Lord.

Peerage of Scotland
Preceded by William Forbes	Lord Forbes; 1483–1491	Succeeded by Arthur Forbes
