= Forbes Park, Chelsea =

Coordinates: 42.4005°N 71.0123°W

Forbes Park is a proposed multi-use development and park in Chelsea, Massachusetts. It comprises 17 acres (69,000 m^{2}) along the Chelsea River and Mill Creek.

It will include around 300 hybrid lofts with retail and creative commercial space. The primary power source will be a 600 kW wind turbine and solar arrays generating over half of the site's power. Rain will be harvested in over 1,000,000 gallons of broad, open canals to supply water for the toilets.
