= Lord Forbes of Pitsligo =

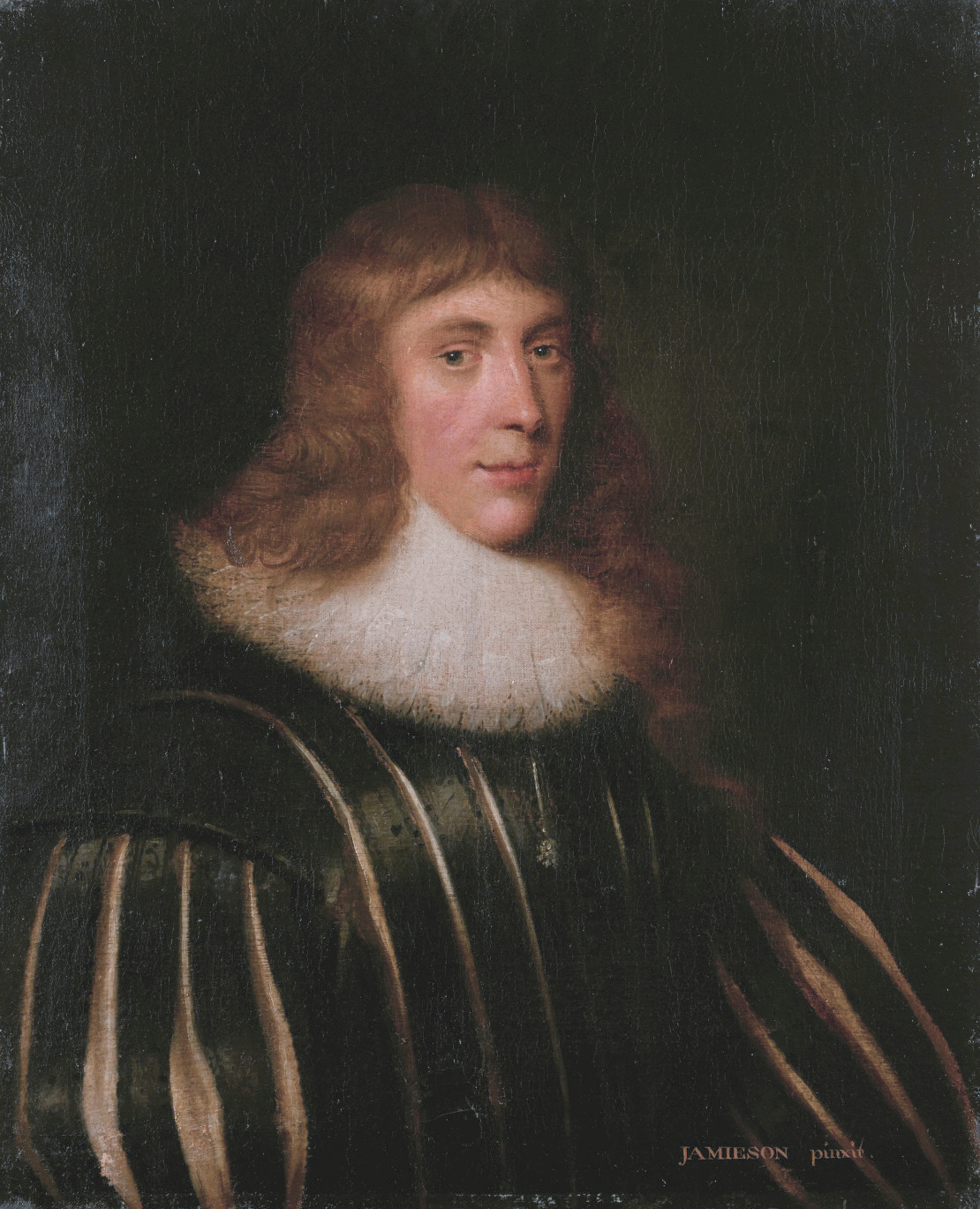
Alexander Forbes, 1st Lord Forbes of Pitsligo

Lord Forbes of Pitsligo was a title in the Peerage of Scotland. It was created on 24 June 1633 for Alexander Forbes. He was a descendant of Sir William Forbes, brother of Alexander Forbes, 1st Lord Forbes (see the Lord Forbes). In 1746, the fourth Lord was attainted for his involvement in the Jacobite rising of 1745, with the lordship forfeited.

The seat of the Lords Forbes of Pitsligo was Pitsligo Castle in Aberdeenshire.

== Lords Forbes of Pitsligo (1633) ==
Arms of the Lord Forbes of Pitsligo: Quarterly: 1st and 4th, Azure, three bears’ heads couped argent, muzzled gules; 2nd and 3rd, Azure, three fraises argent.

- Alexander Forbes, 1st Lord Forbes of Pitsligo (d. 1636)
- Alexander Forbes, 2nd Lord Forbes of Pitsligo (d. c.1662)
- Alexander Forbes, 3rd Lord Forbes of Pitsligo (c.1655–1690)
- Alexander Forbes, 4th Lord Forbes of Pitsligo (d. 1762) (forfeit 1746)

== See also ==
- Lord Forbes
- Forbes baronets
- Clan Forbes
