= Castle Forbes =

Country house in Aberdeenshire, Scotland

Coordinates: 57.261°N 2.630°W

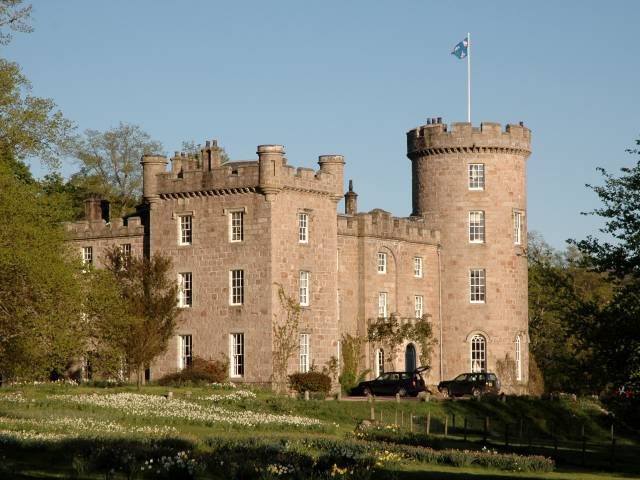
- Castle Forbes in 2007

- Location within Aberdeenshire

Inventory of Gardens and Designed Landscapes in Scotland
- Official name: Castle Forbes
- Designated: 31 March 2006
- Reference no.: GDL00090

Castle Forbes is a 19th-century country house in the Scots Baronial style near Alford in Aberdeenshire, Scotland.

== History ==
The 6,000-acre (2,400-hectare) Vale of Alford estate is the seat of the Lord Forbes. The lands were granted to Sir Alexander Forbes in 1411 for his part in the defeat of Donald of the Isles at the Battle of Harlaw. An earlier house on the site was named Putachie. The present building overlooking the River Don was built in 1815 by the 17th Lord Forbes, to designs by the architect Archibald Simpson. However, after Simpson encountered structural problems and the original section of the house (from c. 1731) began to crack, Simpson was dismissed and the work was completed by the City Architect of Aberdeen, John Smith.

Today it is occupied by Malcolm Forbes, 23rd Lord Forbes and is open to residential guests. The estate offers fishing and golf. In 1996, a former dairy building was converted into a small perfumery.

The structure is a category B listed building and the grounds are included in the Inventory of Gardens and Designed Landscapes in Scotland.

There is a prehistoric stone circle located to the north of the castle.

== Gallery ==
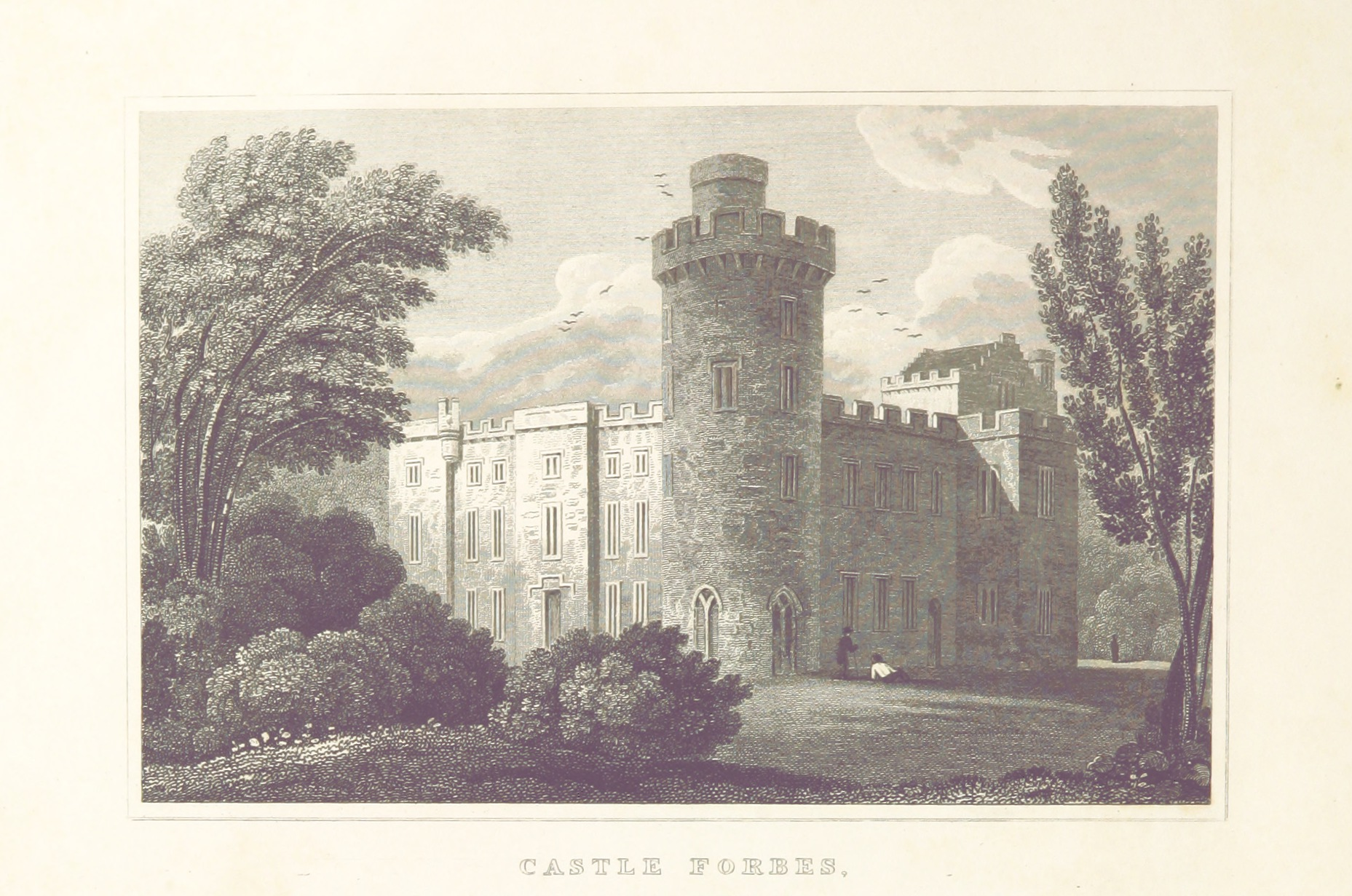
The castle by John Preston Neale

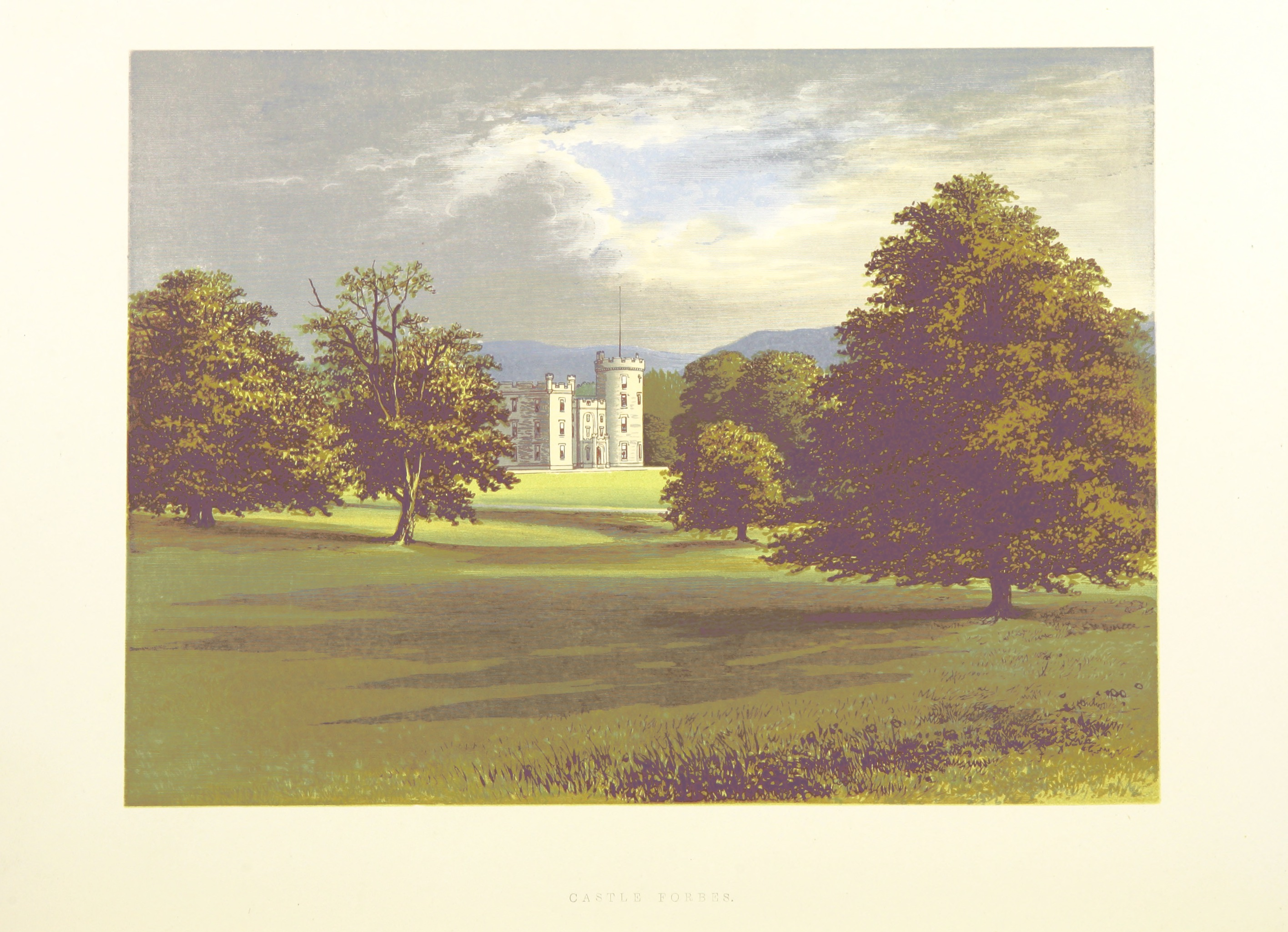
Castle postcard
