= Sir Arthur Forbes, 1st Baronet =

Scottish planter in Ireland

Sir Arthur Forbes, 1st Baronet of Castle Forbes, County Longford, Ireland (c. 1590–1632), took part in the Scottish Plantation of Ireland, and died in a duel at Hamburg, Germany. His son was created Earl of Granard.

== Family ==
Arthur Forbes was a son of William Forbes of Corsse, by his wife Elizabeth Strachan, a daughter of the Laird of Thornton. Forbes was directly descended from the Patrick Forbes of Corsse, a younger son of James Forbes, 2nd Lord Forbes (died 1476) and his spouse, Egidia, daughter of William Keith, Earl-Marischal of Scotland.

== Plantation and baronetcy ==
He settled in Ireland in 1620, and was made by Letters Patent, dated at Dublin, in 1622, a free denizen of that kingdom. In 1626 he is referred to as Captain Arthur Forbes, and on 29 September 1628, he was created a Baronet of Nova Scotia.

== Barony ==
Having made the discovery that several Royal fishings in the province of Ulster belonged to the Crown, he petitioned the king and an inquiry was thereupon instituted. Sir Arthur was eventually rewarded by a grant of such proportion of the said fisheries as he thought proper to demand, besides the sum of £3000 from the profits of the remainder. He had previously obtained extensive territorial possessions from the crown, particularly a grant of various lands in County Longford, in all 1,266 acres (5.12 km^{2}), which were erected into the manor of Castle Forbes, with the usual manorial privileges.

== Death ==
A lieutenant-colonel, he had accompanied his regiment to assist King Gustavus Adolphus of Sweden, but was killed by Frederick Hamilton in a duel at Hamburg in 1632.

== Marriage ==
Forbes married after February 1618, Janet (d. after Sept 1642), daughter of Maurice Lauder of Belhaven and West Barns (d. 1602), Member of Parliament for and Baillie and Burgess of, Dunbar, by his third wife Alison Cass. Janet Lauder was the widow of Claud Hamilton of Creichness, Killach, and Clonwyn in county Cavan, (died before 20 November 1617). This Janet Lauder made a Disposition of certain landed property close to Dunbar which she had inherited from her father. (Mss.Inventory of Charters 1625–45, No.326 at HM Register House)

On 27 December 1641 she obtained a pass to travel from Castle Forbes to Trim, County Meath following the castle's fall to the rebel Irish. She signed an oath on 30 September 1642, relating to the struggle against the rebels. He was succeeded by his son and heir, Sir Arthur Forbes, 1st Earl of Granard, 2nd Bt., (b. 1623).

The family were still resident at Castle Forbes, County Longford, in 1970, with a further residence at 1, Avenue Maréchal Maunoury, Paris, XVI.

Baronetage of Nova Scotia
New creation	Baronet (of Castle Forbes); 1628–1632	Succeeded by Arthur Forbes
