= Corse Castle =

Ruined castle in Scotland

- near Lumphanan, Aberdeenshire in Scotland
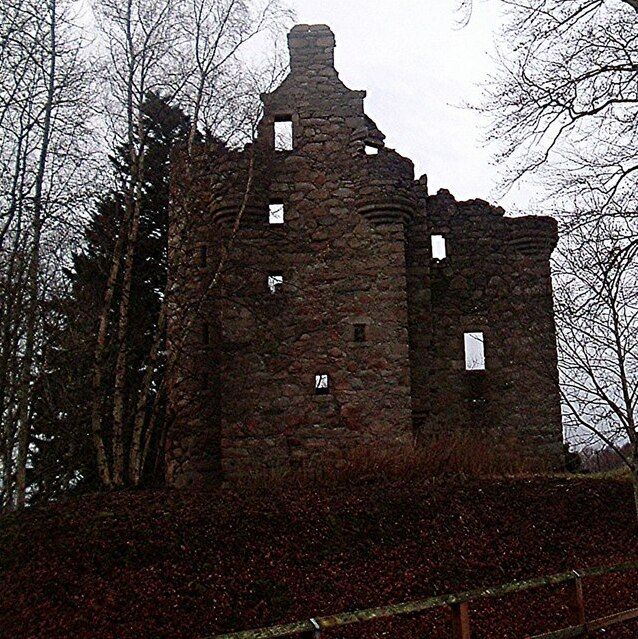
- Ruins of Corse Castle

Site information
- Condition: Ruined

Location
- Coordinates: 57.1552°N 2.7477°W

Site history
- Built: 16th century

Scheduled monument
- Official name: Corse Castle
- Type: Secular: castle
- Designated: 16 April 1964
- Reference no.: SM2414

Corse Castle near Lumphanan in Aberdeenshire, now ruined, was a fortress and centre of a landed estate in the north-east of Scotland. The present castle dates from the 16th century and stands by the Corse Burn, around 3 miles (5 kilometres) north-west of Lumphanan.

== History ==
Corse was a property of the Forbes family. In the 16th century, the original house on the site was destroyed by bandits in a raid. The laird of the day, Sir William Forbes, is reputed to have said of his projected new castle "Please God I will build me such a house as thieves will need to knock at ere they enter." He went on to erect the present castle, which bears his initials, with the date 1581.

William Forbes had seven sons, of whom the eldest, Patrick (1564–1635), was born at the castle before the rebuilding. In 1618, he was appointed Bishop of Aberdeen, serving until his death. The second son, William, a merchant, bought the nearby Craigievar Castle in 1610 and completed it in 1626. The third son, John Forbes (c. 1565–1634) also entered the church. The sixth son, Arthur, settled in Ireland and was created a baronet. Patrick's second son, the theologian John Forbes (1593–1648), inherited Corse in 1635 and died there in 1648, having opposed the National Covenant and been exiled for three years. The Corse estate then went to John Forbes' son George and then his grandson, but due to a lack of further heirs it reverted to the Forbeses of Craigievar, descended from his brother William.

In 1869, the castle was occupied by James Ochoncar Forbes (1837–1900), second son of the late Sir John Forbes, 7th Baronet of Craigievar, by his marriage to Charlotte Elizabeth, a daughter of James Ochoncar Forbes, 17th Lord Forbes. His older brother, William Forbes-Sempill, 17th Lord Sempill, had inherited Craigievar Castle and a peerage from a cousin.

In The Castellated and Domestic Architecture of Scotland (1887), David MacGibbon and Thomas Ross say:

This ruinous castle is pleasantly situated in a retired locality about three miles north from Lumphanan Station on the Deeside Railway. The Corse Burn, which runs through the hollow adjoining, has been dammed up, and forms a fine sheet of water to the south of the castle... The property has long belonged to the Forbeses, and the present building was erected in 1581 by William Forbes, the father of Patrick, the well-known Bishop of Aberdeen. The date and his initials are on the lintel of the entrance doorway... The castle, and modern mansion near it, now belong to James Ochoncar Forbes, Esq.

The castle thus became redundant in the mid 19th century, when it was replaced by a new house. On the death of James Ochoncar Forbes in 1900, the estate was inherited by his son John Walter Forbes, who died unmarried in 1912, and then by his younger son Lieutenant Colonel James Ochoncar Forbes (1867–1945), who was a Deputy Lieutenant for Aberdeenshire. His son Lieutenant Colonel Patrick Walter Forbes (1914–1979) also lived on the estate and likewise became a Deputy Lieutenant.

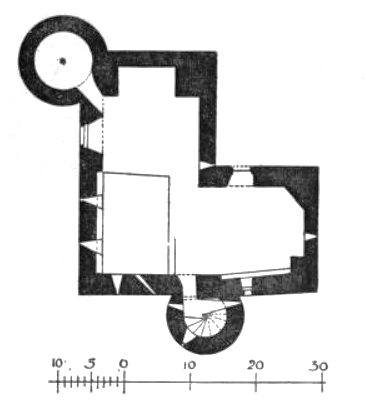
Ground floor plan of Corse Castle

The castle is described by Historic Scotland as "a remarkable survival of the compact 16th century, Scottish Z-plan castle", although W. D. Simpson described it as "an unusual combination of L and Z plans." It has been designated a scheduled monument.

== Notes ==
- Mullan, David George (2004). "Forbes, John, of Corse (1593–1648)". Oxford Dictionary of National Biography (online ed.). Oxford University Press. doi:10.1093/ref:odnb/9836. (Subscription, Wikipedia Library access or UK public library membership required.)
- Sprott, G. W.; MacDonald, Alan R. (2004). "Forbes, John (c.1565–1634)". In MacDonald, Alan R (ed.). Oxford Dictionary of National Biography (online ed.). Oxford University Press. doi:10.1093/ref:odnb/9835. (Subscription, Wikipedia Library access or UK public library membership required.)
