= George Forbes =

George Forbes may refer to:

== Australia ==
- George Forbes (philanthropist) (1915–2006), Australian charity director and women's advocate
- George Forbes (Queensland politician) (1828–1881), Member of the Queensland Legislative Assembly, Australia
- George Forbes (New South Wales politician), member of the New South Wales Legislative Council

== Ireland ==
- George Forbes (footballer, born 1868) (1868–?), Irish footballer
- George Forbes, 3rd Earl of Granard (1685–1765), Anglo-Irish naval commander and diplomatist
- George Forbes, 4th Earl of Granard (1710–1769), MP for St Johnstown (County Longford) and Mullingar
- George Forbes, 5th Earl of Granard (1740–1780), MP for St Johnstown (County Longford)
- George Forbes, 6th Earl of Granard (1760–1837), Irish peer
- George Forbes, 7th Earl of Granard (1833–1889), Irish peer and soldier
- George Forbes, Viscount Forbes (1785–1836), MP for Longford

== New Zealand ==
- George Forbes (New Zealand politician) (1869–1947), Prime Minister of New Zealand

== United Kingdom ==
- George Forbes (businessman) (1944–2022), Scottish farmer and property developer, chairman of Newcastle United F.C.
- George Forbes (scientist) (1849–1936), Scottish electrical engineer, astronomer, and inventor
- George Forbes (footballer, born 1914) (1914–1964), centre half for Blackburn Rovers and Barrow
- George Forbes, 3rd Earl of Granard (1685–1765), Anglo-Irish naval commander and diplomatist
- George Hay Forbes (1821–1875), Scottish Episcopalian clergyman
- George Forbes (cashier), Chief Cashier of the Bank of England from 1866 to 1873
- George Forbes (cricketer) (1906–1984), Scottish cricketer

== Others ==
- George Forbes (Canadian politician) (1840–1925), merchant and political figure in Prince Edward Island
- George W. Forbes (1864–1927), American journalist
- George L. Forbes (born 1931), American politician from Cleveland, Ohio
