= George Forbes, 5th Earl of Granard =

Anglo-Irish politician and peer (1740–1780)

The Right Honourable The Earl of Granard PC

Member of Parliament for St Johnstown
- In office 1762–1768 Serving with Charles Newcomen
- Preceded by: Viscount Forbes; Charles Newcomen
- Succeeded by: Ralph Fetherston; Charles Newcomen

Personal details
- Born: George Forbes; 2 April 1740
- Died: 15 April 1780 (aged 40)
- Spouse(s): Dorothea Bayly (m. 1759; died 1764) Lady Georgiana Augusta Berkeley (m. 1766)
- Relations: John Forbes (uncle)
- Children: 7
- Parent(s): George Forbes, 4th Earl of Granard; Letitia Forbes, Countess of Granard

Military service
- Allegiance: Irish Army, British Army
- Branch/service: Tangier Regiment; 76th Regiment of Foot; 29th Regiment of Foot
- Rank: Lt.-Gen.

George Forbes, 5th Earl of Granard PC (2 April 1740 – 15 April 1780) was an Anglo-Irish politician and peer.

== Early life ==
Forbes was born on 2 April 1740. He was the only son of Lt.-Gen. George Forbes, 4th Earl of Granard and the former Letitia Davys (died 1778), who were first cousins (their mothers were sisters).

His paternal grandparents were George Forbes, 3rd Earl of Granard and the Hon. Mary (née Stewart) Preston (widow of Phineas Preston and eldest daughter of William Stewart, 1st Viscount Mountjoy). His mother was the daughter of Arthur Davys and Hon. Catherine Stewart (second daughter of the 1st Viscount Mountjoy). His paternal uncle was Admiral of the Fleet John Forbes, the father of his cousins, Katherine Wellesley-Pole, Countess of Mornington (wife of William Wellesley-Pole, 3rd Earl of Mornington) and Maria Villiers, Countess of Clarendon (wife of John Villiers, 3rd Earl of Clarendon).

== Career ==
Between 1762 and 1768 he sat in the Irish House of Commons as the Member of Parliament for St Johnstown.

On 16 October 1769 Forbes succeeded to his father's earldom and assumed his seat in the Irish House of Lords. From 1769 to his death he served as Custos Rotulorum of Longford. In 1771, he was made a privy councillor of Ireland.

== Personal life ==
Forbes was twice married. His first marriage was on 12 July 1759 to Dorothea Bayly (1738–1764), the second daughter of Sir Nicholas Bayly, 2nd Baronet of Plas Newydd, by his first wife Caroline Paget (daughter and heiress of Brig.-Gen. Thomas Paget, Governor of Minorca). Dorothea's brother, Henry Bayly, later took the surname of their maternal grandfather was elevated to the peerage as the Earl of Uxbridge. Before Dorothea's death on 19 February 1764, they were the parents of one child:

- George Forbes, 6th Earl of Granard (1760–1837), who married Lady Selena Frances Rawdon (1759–1827), the second daughter of John Rawdon, 1st Earl of Moira, by his third wife Lady Elizabeth Hastings (the only surviving daughter and heiress of Theophilus Hastings, 9th Earl of Huntingdon and Selina Hastings, Countess of Huntingdon).

Forbes remarried on 22 April 1766 to Lady Georgiana Augusta Berkeley (1749–1820) in London. Lady Georgiana was the eldest daughter of Augustus Berkeley, 4th Earl of Berkeley and Elizabeth Drax (eldest daughter of Henry Drax of Ellerton Abbey). Together, they were the parents of six children, including:

- Hon. Henry Forbes (b. 1767), who married Elizabeth Preston, second daughter of John Preston, in 1794.
- Hon. Frederick Forbes (1776–1817), who married Mary Butler, only daughter of John Butler, in 1796.
- Lady Georgiana Anne Forbes, who married Col. Archibald Macneil of Colonsay in 1796.
- Lady Augusta Forbes, who married Lt.-Gen. Sir James Leith of Leith Hall in 1798.
- Lady Louisa Georgiana Forbes (1779–1830), who married Sir William Call, 2nd Baronet of Whiteford in 1806.
- Lady Elizabeth Forbes (d. 1843)

Upon his death on 15 April 1780, he was succeeded in his title by his eldest son from his first marriage, George Forbes. His widow remarried to Rev. Samuel Little in January 1781.

== Coat of arms ==
Coat of arms of George Forbes, 5th Earl of Granard
Coronet A coronet of an Earl Crest Azure three Bears' Heads couped Argent muzzled Gules. Escutcheon A Bear statant Argent guttée de sang muzzled Gules. Supporters Dexter: an Unicorn Erminois armed maned tufted and unguled Or; Sinister: a Dragon wings expanded Ermine. Motto Fax Mentis Incendium Gloriae (The incitement to glory is the firebrand of the mind)

Parliament of Ireland
Preceded by Viscount Forbes; Charles Newcomen	Member of Parliament for St Johnstown; 1762–1768; With: Charles Newcomen	Succeeded by Ralph Fetherston; Charles Newcomen
Peerage of Ireland
Preceded by George Forbes	Earl of Granard; 1769–1780	Succeeded by George Forbes
Preceded by George Forbes	Viscount Granard; 1769–1780	Succeeded by George Forbes
Baronetage of Nova Scotia
Preceded by George Forbes	Baronet (of Castle Forbes); 1769–1780	Succeeded by George Forbes
