= George Forbes, 3rd Earl of Granard =

Royal Navy officer, diplomat, politician and colonial administrator

Admiral The Right Honourable The Earl of Granard PC (Ire)

Member of Parliament for Ayr Burghs
- In office 1741–1747
- Preceded by: James Stuart
- Succeeded by: Charles Erskine

Governor of the Leeward Islands
- In office 1729–1729
- Preceded by: William Cosby
- Succeeded by: William Mathew, Jr.

Member of Parliament for Queenborough
- In office 1723–1727 Serving with John Cope
- Preceded by: James Littleton; John Cope
- Succeeded by: Sprig Manesty; John Crowley

Personal details
- Born: George Forbes; 21 October 1685 Ireland
- Died: 19 June 1765 (aged 79) Ireland
- Party: Whig
- Spouse: Hon. Mary Stewart Preston (m. 1709; died 1755)
- Relations: Arthur Forbes, 1st Earl of Granard (grandfather)
- Children: George Forbes, 4th Earl of Granard; John Forbes; Lady Mary Forbes
- Parent(s): Arthur Forbes, 2nd Earl of Granard; Mary Rawdon
- Education: Drogheda Grammar School

George Forbes, 3rd Earl of Granard, PC (Ire) (21 October 1685 – 19 June 1765) was a Royal Navy officer, diplomat, politician, peer and colonial administrator. He was at the Capture of Gibraltar. He took a very valuable prize ship and was briefly a Governor of the Leeward Islands. He took a role in politics, helping to end Robert Walpole's career, but eventually retired.

== Early life ==
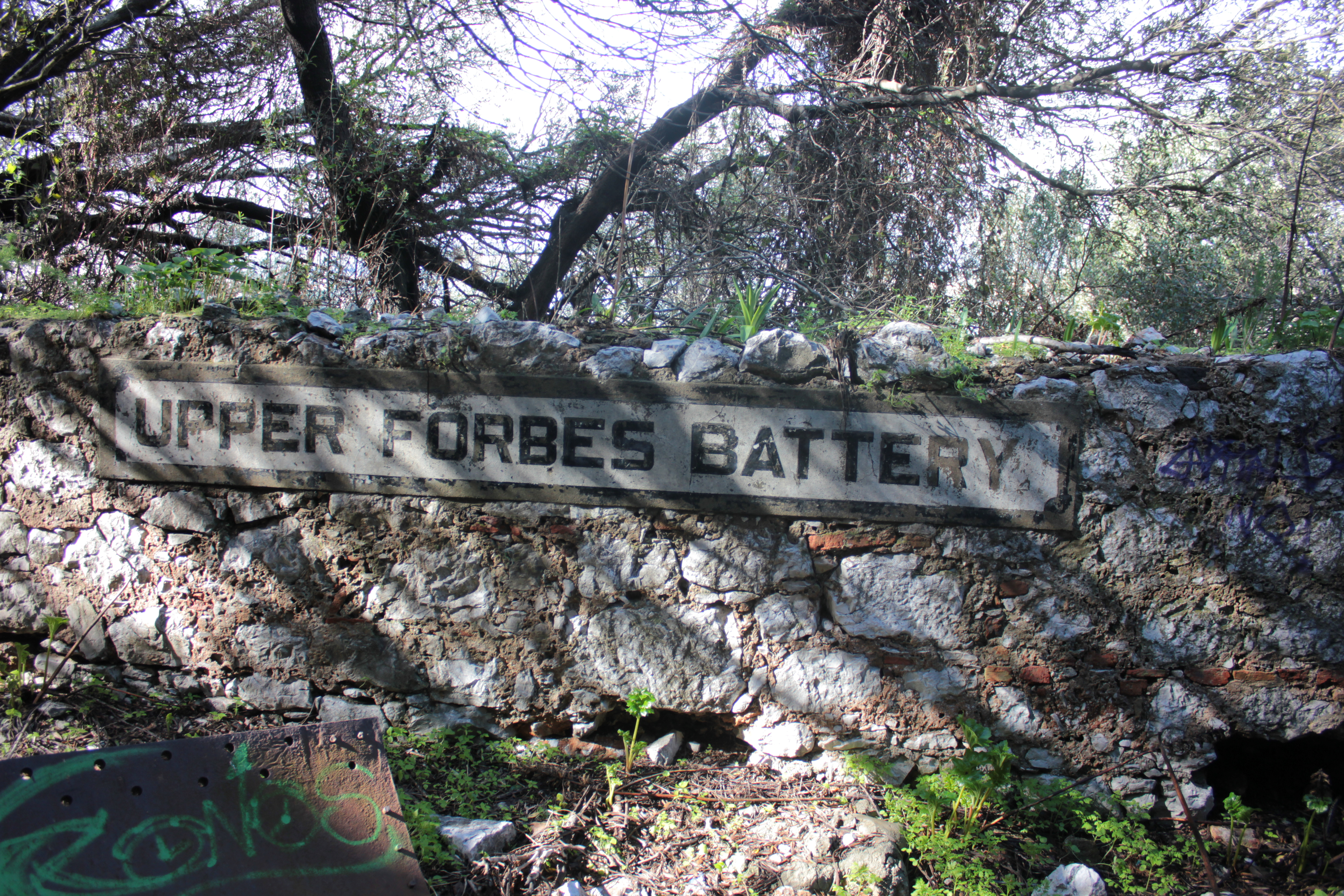
Batteries, a Quarry and a Barrier are named for Forbes on Gibraltar

Forbes was the son of Arthur Forbes, 2nd Earl of Granard and Mary, daughter of Sir George Rawdon, 1st Baronet, of Moira, County Down, was born in Ireland on 21 October 1685. He was for a time educated in Drogheda Grammar School.

His grandfather, Arthur Forbes, first earl, died when young Forbes was about twelve years of age. Coming to London with his grandmother in 1702, he introduced himself to Admiral George Churchill, then first of the council to the Lord High Admiral, Prince George of Denmark, and sought to enter the navy.

== Career ==
Churchill appointed him to the Royal Anne at Portsmouth, and made him a lieutenant in the marines. Forbes was midshipman on HMS St George in 1704, and was with George Rooke at the Capture of Gibraltar, where he was on shore as aide-de-camp to the Prince of Hesse-Darmstadt and in the Battle of Málaga the same year. Forbes became heir to the earldom on the death of his elder brother, a captain in the Scots royals, from wounds received at the Battle of Blenheim.

In 1705, Forbes was second lieutenant of the frigate Triton, one of the most active cruisers in the navy. The Triton captured twenty-three French privateers in the Channel in fifteen months. He was in her at the siege of Ostend in 1706, where he was on shore, and first met, the Duke of Argyll, who commanded in the trenches. Forbes found his commission as captain of the Lynn frigate, in which he served as convoy to the Baltic Sea trade. The Lynn being ordered to the West Indies, Forbes was transferred to the Gosport, and on 3 January 1707 to the Leopard of 50 guns. On 6 March 1707, he was appointed brigadier in the 4th troop of horse-guards, of which the Duke of Argyll was captain and colonel.

The brigadiers of the horse-guards—styled in their commissions 'corporals,’ and in society 'captains'—were commissioned officers ranking with lieutenants of horse. Forbes did duty with his troop until appointed to command the Sunderland of 60 guns, part of the western squadron under Lord Dursley, afterwards third Earl Berkeley.

In 1708, Forbes became exempt from his troop and a brother of the Trinity House. In May 1709, he left his ship to do duty with his troop at Windsor, where "his sprightliness of genius and politeness of manner recommended him to Queen Anne", at whose desire he was appointed to the Grafton of 70 guns. Forbes, who in the meantime had married, sailed for the Mediterranean with Sir John Norris in 1710. Charles III of Spain (afterwards the emperor Charles VI) then had his court at Barcelona, and Norris stationed some ships off the coast of Catalonia, the command of which was assigned to Forbes, who was directed to co-operate as much as possible with the Spanish court, and was permitted to reside on shore. Two Genoese ships of war, of 50 and 70 guns respectively, were at Cádiz taking in specie, alleged to be for the use of the French faction in Italy.

The Spanish king proposed that Forbes should put out to sea and seize the vessels on their return voyage. Forbes explained that England was at peace with the Genoese republic; but being pressed by the king, and the queen offering him her sign-manual for his indemnification, he started with his own ship, the Grafton of 70 guns, and the Chatham of 50 guns, Captain Nicholas Haddock, took the Genoese ships into Port Mahon, discharged the officers and crews to shore, landed the specie, amounting to 1,600,000 dollars, and returned with the ships to Barcelona. Charles III, greatly pleased, made Forbes a grant of the duty payable at the mint for coinage of the amount, and urged him to go back to Menorca and fetch the specie.

Forbes, doubting the legality of the capture, excused himself until he should receive instructions from home, or from General Stanhope, the British ambassador and commander-in-chief in Spain, and, to avoid any appearance of backwardness, set out to confer with Stanhope. He joined the part of the allied army under Marshal Staremberg, and was slightly wounded while charging with Brigadier Lepell's regiment at the battle of Villaviciosa, 10 December 1710. Stanhope had surrendered at Brihuega the day previous. Forbes returned to Barcelona, and found orders from home forbidding the disposal of the Genoese treasure, which sorely disconcerted the Spanish court. Forbes came to England bearing an autograph letter from Charles III to Queen Anne. Eventually, the British government decided to retain the capture and indemnify the Genoese republic. In the end, Forbes accepted £ 6,000 in lieu of what had promised to prove a large fortune.

In January 1711, the Duke of Argyll was appointed to the command in Spain. He set out leaving Forbes, who was to serve with him, in London to solicit supplies for the army, which was short of money. Forbes obtained an order for eight hundred thousand dollars of the Genoese treasure, and set off, riding through the Netherlands, Germany, the Tyrol, and Italy to Genoa, where he took ship, with such despatch that he reached Barcelona in twenty-one days from England. During that year, he served with the army in Spain, at the head of three hundred cavalrymen drafted from home, whom Argyll purposed to form into a new regiment of horse under Forbes's command. The regiment was never completed, as peace negotiations were too far advanced. A return of the army in Spain, dated 19 February 1712, is in Treasury Papers, cxliv. 23, and is the only paper of any interest entered under Forbes's name in the Calendars of State Papers for the period.

In 1712, Forbes was appointed to the Greenwich of 50 guns, and became cornet and major in his troop of horse-guards. After the peace of Utrecht he commanded a small squadron of vessels in the Mediterranean, and took up his residence with his wife and child in Menorca, whence he returned home in 1716. The year after he was appointed lieutenant-governor of the castle of St. Phillipa, Menorca, and acted as governor of the island during the brief hostilities with Spain in 1718. He introduced better order on the island, and abolished the trials for witchcraft, which had been a source of much misery.

On his return home in 1719, Forbes, at the desire of George I, proceeded to Vienna, to carry into effect a long-cherished project of the emperor Charles VI, of forming a naval power either in Naples and Sicily or on the Adriatic, for which purpose Forbes received the rank of vice-admiral in the imperial service with a salary of twelve thousand florins a year, and unlimited powers of organisation. But the imperialist ministers looked coldly on the scheme, and adopted a policy of tacit obstruction, which at the end of two years led Forbes to resign his appointment in a private audience with the emperor, who presented him with a valuable diamond ring in recognition of his services. Forbes joined the king at Hanover, and afterwards returned home.

In 1724 he was appointed to command the Canterbury of 60 guns on the Mediterranean station, and was employed on shore at the defence of Gibraltar against the Spaniards in 1726–7. On 11 March 1727 Forbes along with HMS Royal Oak captured the brand new Spanish 46-gun Fifth-rate warship Nuestra Senor Del Rosario not far from Cádiz during a relief effort into Gibraltar. In September that same year Forbes, who had previously sat in the English House of Commons for the borough of Queenborough, was called to the Irish house of peers under the title of Baron Forbes.

=== Governor of the Leeward Islands ===
In 1729, he was appointed governor and captain-general of the Leeward Islands, a post he resigned at the end of a year. In 1730, he proposed to the government to lead a colony to Lake Erie, where it would form a barrier against French encroachments from Canada. He was to be fettered by "no restrictions beyond the ten commandments," and was to have an annual grant of £ 12,000 for the use of the colony for seven years. If the government at the end of that time was satisfied to take over the settlement, Forbes was to be created an English peer, with a perpetual pension of £ 1,000 a year out of the revenues of the post office. If the government were not satisfied to take over the colony, a grant of the sum was to be made to Forbes and his heirs, with a palatinate jurisdiction, similar to that of Lord Baltimore in Maryland, in which case Forbes was to repay the £ 84,000 advanced, and pledged his family estates as security for the amount. Sir Robert Walpole, who disliked Forbes as being "too busy and curious," admitted the fairness of the terms, but the project was not carried out. In 1731 Forbes was appointed to the Cornwall of 80 guns, and commanded that ship in the Mediterranean under Sir Charles Wager. This was the last time he served afloat.

=== Minister to Russia ===
In 1733 Forbes was appointed envoy extraordinary and minister plenipotentiary to the Empress Anna of Russia. He negotiated and concluded a treaty – the first entered into by the court of St. Petersburg with any European state – for the better regulation of the customs, and for favouring the introduction of British woollen goods. After his return to England in 1734 the czarina, with whom he was a favourite, offered him supreme command of the imperial Russian navy, which he declined. He obtained his flag rank and succeeded to the title of Earl of Granard on the death of his father the same year.

=== Later life ===
In 1737, Granard, who was a member of the Irish Linen Company, and took much interest in political economy, was instrumental in introducing improvements in the Irish currency. When the popular outcry against Spain arose in 1739, he was offered the command of "a stout squadron" for the West Indies, but declined, believing the ministry not to be in earnest; nevertheless when his senior, Admiral Edward Vernon, who had been laid aside, was brought back over his head and sent out, Granard considered himself superseded, and refused to serve again. His name was retained on the flag list, and half-pay was issued for him for some time, but on 31 December 1742 his resignation was finally accepted.

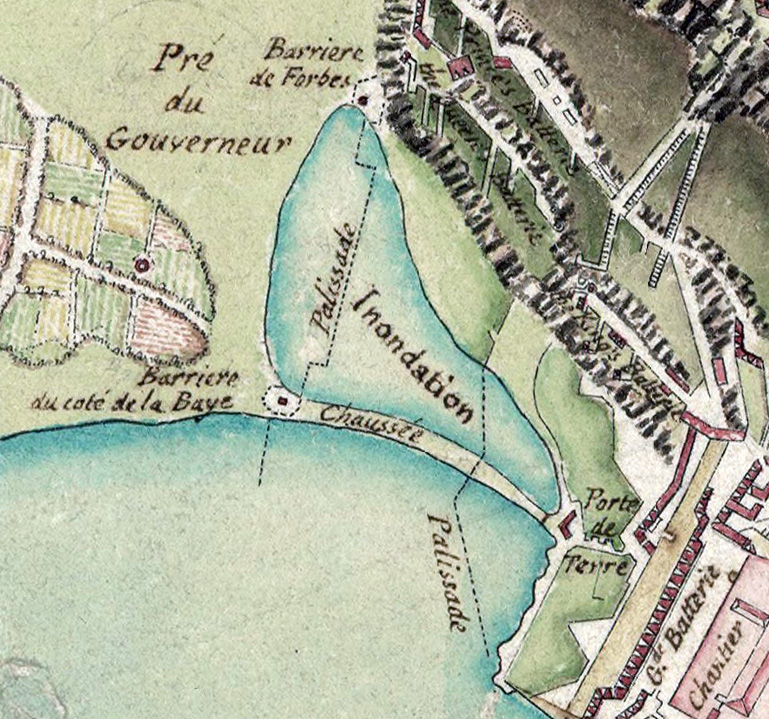
Forbes' Barrier was one of only two routes, on each side of the Inundation, that approached the fortress of Gibraltar

The statement of some biographers that he continued in the service, and was senior admiral at his death, arose from confusing Granard – who was better known in the naval service as Lord Forbes – with his son, Admiral of the Fleet the Hon. John Forbes. Granard had retired from the army more than twenty years before he left the sister service. He had been in treaty with Lord Dundonald for the command of the 4th troop of horse-guards, for which he was to give 10,000 £, but broke off the negotiations at the wish of the Duke of Argyll, who desired to see him rise to the head of the navy. By Argyll's interest, Granard was returned to the House of Commons for the Scottish burghs of Ayr, Irvine, etc., in 1741, and took a very active part in the stormy discussions which drove Sir Robert Walpole from office on 3 February 1742, in consequence of which he was appointed one of the committee of inquiry into the conduct of the ex-minister. But he subsequently separated from his colleagues in disgust and retired from public life.

He was made a privy councillor of Ireland and in 1740 appointed Governor of County Westmeath and Longford, resigning in 1756.

== Personal life ==
In person, Granard was of middle height and spare figure, with a dark complexion, and strongly marked features. In his habits he was very active and extremely abstemious, eating little and drinking nothing but water, customs to which he attributed his good health. He was a great reader, with a very retentive memory, and a quick, intelligent observer. The family manuscripts contain several treatises by him on subjects connected with political economy, geography, and the naval resources of different countries.

In 1709, Lord Forbes married Hon. Mary Stewart Preston, the eldest daughter of William Stewart, 1st Viscount Mountjoy, and Mary Coote (eldest daughter of Richard Coote, 1st Baron Coote). Mary was the widow of Phineas Preston of Ardsallagh, County Meath, with whom she had had two children. By Mary, who died 4 October 1755, Forbes had three children:

- George Forbes, 4th Earl of Granard (1710–1769), who saw a good deal of army service in the Mediterranean in his earlier years, raised the old 76th foot, which was disbanded in 1763, and died a major-general and colonel of the 29th Foot in 1769; he married his cousin Letitia Davys, daughter of Arthur Davys, in 1736.
- Hon. John Forbes (1714–1796), the Admiral of the Fleet who married Lady Mary Capell, a daughter of William Capell, 3rd Earl of Essex, in 1758.
- Lady Mary Forbes (d. 1797), who married James Irvine of Kingcausie.

Lord Granard died aged 80 in Ireland on 19 June 1765.

=== Descendants ===
Through his eldest son, he was a grandfather of George Forbes, 5th Earl of Granard, a Member of Parliament for St Johnstown from 1762 to 1768 who married twice and had issue.

Through his second son, he was a grandfather to twin girls: Katherine Forbes, who married William Wellesley-Pole, 3rd Earl of Mornington, and Maria Forbes, married John Villiers, 3rd Earl of Clarendon.

== Legacy ==
Forbes' Battery, a series of artillery batteries on Gibraltar, were named for Forbes and Forbes' Quarry is named after the battery. The Neanderthal skull Gibraltar 1 was found in the quarry. After William Green became Gibraltar's Senior Engineer in 1761, he had the refortified Advance Guard Room renamed Forbes's Barrier.

== Coat of arms ==
Coat of arms of George Forbes, 3rd Earl of Granard
Coronet A coronet of an Earl Crest Azure three Bears' Heads couped Argent muzzled Gules. Escutcheon A Bear statant Argent guttée de sang muzzled Gules. Supporters Dexter: an Unicorn Erminois armed maned tufted and unguled Or; Sinister: a Dragon wings expanded Ermine. Motto Fax Mentis Incendium Gloriae (The incitement to glory is the firebrand of the mind)

Parliament of Great Britain
Preceded by James Littleton; John Cope	Member of Parliament for Queenborough; 1723–1727; With: John Cope	Succeeded by Sprig Manesty; John Crowley
Preceded by James Stuart	Member of Parliament for Ayr Burghs; 1741–1747	Succeeded by Charles Erskine
Peerage of Ireland
Preceded by Arthur Forbes	Earl of Granard; 1734–1765	Succeeded by George Forbes
Preceded by Arthur Forbes	Viscount Granard; 1734–1765	Succeeded by George Forbes
Baronetage of Nova Scotia
Preceded by Arthur Forbes	Baronet (of Castle Forbes); 1734–1765	Succeeded by George Forbes
