= 72nd Regiment of Foot (disambiguation) =

Five regiments of the British Army have been numbered the 72nd Regiment of Foot:

- 72nd Regiment of Foot, raised as the Earl of Berkeley's Regiment of Foot in 1745 and disbanded in 1746
- 72nd Regiment of Foot (1758), raised by re-designation of 2nd Battalion, 33rd Regiment of Foot in 1758 and disbanded in 1763
- 72nd Regiment of Foot (Invalids), raised as 82nd Regiment of Foot (Invalids) in 1757, re-numbered as the 72nd Regiment of Foot in 1764 and disbanded in 1767
- 72nd Regiment of Foot (Royal Manchester Volunteers), raised in 1777 and disbanded in 1783
- 72nd Regiment, Duke of Albany's Own Highlanders, raised in 1778 as the Seaforth (Highland) Regiment, re-numbered as the 72nd Foot in 1786 and amalgamated in 1881
