= Custos Rotulorum of Longford =

The Custos Rotulorum of Longford was the highest civil officer in County Longford.

Custos rotulorum is latin for "keeper of the rolls".

== Incumbents ==
- 1661–?: Francis Aungier, 1st Earl of Longford (died 1700)
- 1765–1769: George Forbes, 4th Earl of Granard
- 1769–1780: George Forbes, 5th Earl of Granard
- 1780–1813: George Forbes, 6th Earl of Granard
- 1813–1836: George John Forbes, Viscount Forbes

For later (post 1831) custodes rotulorum, see Lord Lieutenant of Longford
