= Countess of Mornington =

Countess of Mornington is a title given to the wife of the Earl of Mornington. Women who have held the title include:

- Katherine Wellesley-Pole, Countess of Mornington (c.1760-1851)
- Hyacinthe-Gabrielle Roland (1766–1816)
- Elizabeth Wellesley, Duchess of Wellington (1820–1904)
- Diana Wellesley, Duchess of Wellington (1922–2010)
- Jemma Wellesley, Marchioness of Douro (born 1974)
