= Thomas Newcomen (MP for St Johnstown) =

Anglo-Irish politician

Thomas Newcomen (1693 – May 1782) was an Anglo-Irish politician.

He represented St Johnstown, County Longford, in the Irish House of Commons between 1727 and 1760.

Parliament of Ireland
Preceded by Henry Edgeworth; Robert Edgeworth	Member of Parliament for St Johnstown; 1727–1760; With: Henry Edgeworth (1727–1751); Hon. John Forbes (1751–1760)	Succeeded by George Forbes, Viscount Forbes; Charles Newcomen
