= Elizabeth Berkeley =

Elizabeth Berkeley may refer to:

- Elizabeth Berkeley, Countess of Warwick (1386–1422), née de Berkeley, wife of 13th Earl of Warwick
- Elizabeth Berkeley, Countess Berkeley (c. 1720–1792), British court official
- Elizabeth Berkeley, Countess of Ormond, wife of Thomas Butler, 10th Earl of Ormond
- Lady Elizabeth Germain (1680–1769), née Lady Elizabeth Berkeley, daughter of Charles Berkeley, 2nd Earl of Berkeley
- Elizabeth Somerset, Duchess of Beaufort (c. 1713–1799), née Berkeley, mother of Henry Somerset, 5th Duke of Beaufort and wife of Charles, 4th Duke of Beaufort
- Elizabeth, Princess Berkeley (1750–1828), daughter of the 4th Earl of Berkeley, wife of Lord Craven and then morganatically, of Margrave of Brandenburg-Ansbach
- Winifred L. Jackson, who collaborated on two stories with H. P. Lovecraft as Elizabeth (Neville) Berkeley

== See also ==
- Elizabeth Berkley (born 1974), American actress
