= George Forbes, 6th Earl of Granard =

Irish general and peer (1760–1837)

General The Right Honourable The Earl of Granard PC (Ire)

Governor of County Longford
- In office 1780–1831
- Succeeded by: George Forbes, Viscount Forbes

Personal details
- Born: George Forbes; 14 June 1760
- Died: 9 June 1837 (aged 76) Champs-Elysées, Paris
- Spouse: Lady Selina Frances Rawdon (m. 1779; died 1827)
- Relations: George Forbes, 4th Earl of Granard (grandfather); Letitia Forbes, Countess of Granard (grandmother)
- Children: 9
- Parent: Dorothea Bayly

George Forbes, 6th Earl of Granard, PC (Ire) (14 June 1760 – 9 June 1837) was an Irish general and peer.

== Early life ==
Forbes was born on 14 June 1760 and was educated at Armagh. He was the eldest son of George Forbes, 5th Earl of Granard, by his first wife, Dorothea Bayly, second daughter of Sir Nicholas Bayly, 2nd Baronet, of the Isle of Anglesea, and great-grandson of Admiral George Forbes, 3rd Earl of Granard.

On succeeding to the title in 1780, the year after his marriage, he made a lengthened tour on the continent. He was introduced to Cardinal Henry Benedict Stuart at Rome, attended one of Frederick the Great's reviews in Silesia, and resided in France and at Vienna.

== Career ==
Earl of Granard coat of arms

On his return home he devoted himself to politics, and, following the example of his parents-in-law, Lord and Lady Moira, adopted liberal opinions. With his votes and interest he steadily supported the policy of Charlemont, Grattan, Curran, and other leaders of the liberal party in Ireland. The Marquis of Buckingham, Lord Lieutenant of Ireland, referred to him as the most uncompromising opponent of his administration.

On the outbreak of the French Revolutionary War, as Governor of County Longford, Granard raised the Prince of Wales's Royal Longford Militia under the Irish Militia Act of 1793, and was commissioned as Lieutenant-Colonel Commandant of the battalion on 11 April 1793. He was appointed a lieutenant-colonel in the army on 17 May 1794, and lieutenant-colonel commandant of the 108th Foot, an Irish regiment which he raised in November following. The 108th was disbanded at Gibraltar in 1796. The Royal Longford Militia was later augmented, and Granard was confirmed as Colonel of the Regiment, with seniority from 25 April 1793.

Early in 1798, when a rising by the United Irishmen was expected, the Royal Longford Militia was stationed at Ennis in County Clare, with Granard appointed officer commanding the county. When the Irish Rebellion broke out in May he was empowered to try civilians by court martial if necessary.

The Royal Longford Militia played little part in suppressing the main rebellion, but in August a French force under General Humbert belatedly landed in Ireland. The Royal Longford Militia was ordered to march to join the concentration of British forces to oppose this invasion. Granard marched out on 24 August with the four available companies of his regiment and arrived at Castlebar on the evening of 26 August, having marched 80 miles from Ennis in three days. The exhausted men bivouacked in the street. Humbert attacked next morning and the small British force deployed outside the town to meet him. The Kilkenny Militia and some guns were placed along the ridge, with Granard's men in support in their left rear, the second line behind. The guns held off several French attacks, but when Humbert deployed to outflank the Kilkennys, they opened fire at too long a range and then attempted to retire. This was too much for inexperienced troops, and they broke and ran, sweeping away part of Granard's men and the whole of the second line. With the remainder of his regiment, and those men he could rally, Granard carried out a retirement in reasonable order, firing volleys to cover the retreat of the force. Threatened with being enveloped, Granard retired to Castlebar Bridge in the town where, with the assistance of a gun, he managed to hold on for about half an hour. However, the rest of the force that had retired into Castlebar was in complete confusion behind him and failed to rally there. Under crossfire from the houses across the bridge, all of the gunners were shot down and although Granard's men repulsed the first attempt by French Hussars to cross the bridge, their infantry came on and engaged in hand-to-hand fighting on the bridge while other parties waded across the river on either side. Granard retired, forming a rearguard for the broken army, which was fleeing across the countryside, giving rise to the battle's nickname, the 'Castlebar Races'. Granard and the remnants of the Royal Longford Militia reached Tuam the following morning All the army's baggage and cannons in Castlebar fell into the hands of the enemy. On 30 August Granard and his survivors fell back to Athlone forming part of the garrison there while larger government forces were gathered. These defeated Humbert's force at the Battle of Ballinamuck on 8 September, where Granard may have been present. Although the authorities were highly critical of the performance of the Irish Militia, the Commander-in-Chief, Lord Cornwallis, wrote in highest praise of Granard's gallantry in endeavouring to rally his regiment.

Granard displayed the greatest aversion to the union, an opinion from which none of the inducements then so lavishly offered by the government made him swerve, and he was one of the twenty-one Irish peers who recorded their protest against the measure. Having been deprived of his seat in the House of Lords after the union, he took little part in politics, but devoted himself to the management of his estates, and is said to have been a popular landlord.

During the brief administration of 'All the Talents' in 1806 he was made a peer of the United Kingdom under the title of Baron Granard of Castle Donington, Leicestershire (the seat of his father-in-law), and was also appointed clerk of the crown and hanaper in Ireland, then a most lucrative office. He became a colonel in the army in 1801, major-general in 1808, and lieutenant-general in 1813.

Afterwards, Granard mainly lived in France. He came to England to support both the Roman Catholic Emancipation and Reform Bills, and after the passing of the latter was offered a promotion in the peerage, which he declined, as he had previously refused the order of St. Patrick. He was made full general in July 1830.

== Personal life ==
On 10 May 1779, he married Lady Selina Frances Rawdon, youngest daughter of John Rawdon, 1st Earl of Moira by his third wife, Lady Elizabeth Hastings (the eldest daughter of the ninth Earl of Huntingdon). By this lady, who was sister of the first Marquis of Hastings, Granard had nine children, including:

- Maj.-Gen. Hon. George John Forbes, styled Viscount Forbes (1785–1836), a Whig Member of Parliament for County Longford, Lord Lieutenant of County Longford who married Frances Mary Territt, daughter and heiress of Dr. William Territt of Chilton Hall, in 1832. Frances was a Woman of the Bedchamber to Queen Victoria from 1837 to 1874. After his death, she married Thomas Nugent Vaughan in 1838.
- Hon. Francis Reginald Forbes (1791–1873), who served as Minister Plenipotentiary to Saxony in 1858 and Envoy Extraordinary and Minister Plenipotentiary to Brazil.
- Capt. Hon. Hastings Brudenell Forbes (1793–1815), who was killed at the Battle of Waterloo.
- Hon. Angoulême Moira Forbes (1796–1810), who died young.
- Hon. Ferdinando William Forbes (1801–1802), who died in infancy.
- Lady Elizabeth Maria Theresa Forbes (1786–1852), who married George Parkyns, 2nd Baron Rancliffe, in 1807.
- Lady Selina Francis Forbes (d. 1791)
- Lady Adelaide Dorothea Forbes (d. 1858)
- Lady Caroline Selina Forbes (d. 1872)

He died at his residence, the Hôtel Marbœuf, Champs-Elysées, Paris, on 9 June 1837, at the age of seventy-seven, and was buried in the family resting-place at Newtownforbes, County Longford, Ireland.

=== Descendants ===
Through his eldest son George, he was the grandfather of two: George Arthur Hastings Forbes, 7th Earl of Granard, and Capt. Hon. William Francis Forbes DL (1836–1899).

== Coat of arms ==
Coat of arms of George Forbes, 6th Earl of Granard
Coronet A coronet of an Earl Crest Azure three Bears' Heads couped Argent muzzled Gules. Escutcheon A Bear statant Argent guttée de sang muzzled Gules. Supporters Dexter: an Unicorn Erminois armed maned tufted and unguled Or; Sinister: a Dragon wings expanded Ermine. Motto Fax Mentis Incendium Gloriae (The incitement to glory is the firebrand of the mind)

Peerage of Ireland
Preceded by George Forbes	Earl of Granard; 1780–1837	Succeeded by George Forbes
