= Mary Stewart, Viscountess Mountjoy =

British noblewoman (1654–1720)

Mary Stewart, Viscountess Mountjoy (1654–1720), formerly the Honourable Mary Coote, was the wife of William Stewart, 1st Viscount Mountjoy. She was the daughter of Richard Coote, 1st Baron Coote (1620-1683), and his wife, the former Mary St George. Her brother was Richard Coote, 1st Earl of Bellomont.

The viscount and viscountess had six sons and two daughters, including:

- Sir William Stewart, 2nd Viscount Mountjoy (1675–1728), who married Anne Boyle, daughter of Murrough Boyle, 1st Viscount Blesington, on 23 November 1696.
- Alexander Stewart, who had one daughter, Anne Stewart, his sole heiress.
- Mary Stewart (c. 1677–1765), who first married Archibald Preston (1672–1703). After his death, she married Vice Admiral George Forbes, 3rd Earl of Granard (1685–1765).
- Catherine Stewart, who married Arthur Davys (d. 1733), an Irish Member of Parliament, representing Carrickfergus in the Irish House of Commons.
- Charles Stewart (1681–1741), who became an officer in the Royal Navy and a Member of Parliament
