= Albert College =

Albert College may refer to:

- Albert College (Dublin), Dublin City University, Dublin
- Albert Einstein College of Medicine, New York
- Albert College (Belleville, Ontario)
