= 82nd Regiment of Foot =

82nd Regiment of Foot may refer to one of three regiments of the British Army that have been numbered the 82nd Regiment of Foot

- 82nd Regiment of Foot (Invalids), renumbered the 72nd Regiment of Foot (Invalids) in 1764
- 82nd Regiment of Foot (Prince of Wales's Volunteers)
- 82nd Regiment of Foot (1777)
