= Charles Newcomen =

Anglo-Irish politician

Charles Newcomen (1707 – 1772) was an Anglo-Irish politician.

Newcomen sat in the Irish House of Commons as the Member of Parliament for St Johnstown, County Longford, between 1761 and his death in 1772.

Parliament of Ireland
Preceded by Hon. John Forbes; Thomas Newcomen	Member of Parliament for St Johnstown; 1761–1772; With: George Forbes, Viscount Forbes (1761–1762); George Forbes (1762–1768); Ralph Fetherston (1768–1772)	Succeeded by Ralph Fetherston; Robert Jephson
