= The Smith Family (charity) =

Australian non-profit organization

- Formation: 1922 (Sydney, NSW)
- Type: Non-profit organisation
- Legal status: Public Benevolent Institution (PBI); Income Tax Exempt Charity; Deductible Gift Recipient (DGR)
- Purpose: Overcoming educational inequality caused by poverty through support for disadvantaged children and young people
- Headquarters: Sydney, Australia
- Region served: Australia
- CEO: Doug Taylor
- Board Chair: Nicholas Moore AO
- Affiliations: Australian Council of Social Service
- Staff: 983 (FY23–24)
- Volunteers: 4,913
- Website: www.thesmithfamily.com.au

The Smith Family is an Australian, independent non-profit children's charity whose goal is to create opportunities for disadvantaged Australian children and their families and encourage them to participate more fully in society, using education as a key tool.

== History ==
On Christmas Eve 1922, five Sydney businessmen returning from a trip to the Blue Mountains delivered gifts of toys and sweets to the Carlingford Boys Home. In order to remain anonymous, each man responded “Smith” when asked for their names. The Smith Family was formally created in 1923.

During the Depression of the late 1920s and early 30s, The Smith Family assisted with the food and clothing needs of thousands of Australians.

In 1933 when rheumatic fever became a major health issue affecting children, The Smith Family set up a special hospital, Mt Arcadia, in North Parramatta, to care for them. It closed in 1958.

In 1960, The Smith Family, under the leadership of General Secretary George Forbes, founded VIEW Clubs Australia (Voice, Interest and Education of Women) to provide a support network for women.

The 1970s saw The Smith Family react to the needs of refugee families fleeing war in Vietnam and Timor and supporting the residents of Darwin as they recovered from the devastation inflicted by Cyclone Tracy.

== Today ==
In 1997, The Smith Family started the Learning for Life program, which aims to enable disadvantaged children and young people to get the opportunities they need to fully participate in their education and create better futures for themselves.

Learning for Life provides long term support for young Australians in need, all the way through their schooling years. This approach gives ongoing assistance to disadvantaged students, so they can develop and build vital life skills, stay engaged in their education and have the best opportunity to break the cycle of disadvantage.

Through Learning for Life, The Smith Family connects students to sponsors whose financial support helps families afford the cost of their children’s essential school items such as uniforms, text books and school excursions. Learning for Life workers in 94 communities link students to local learning opportunities and also encourage them to make the most of their education through participating in a range of learning support and mentoring programs.

The Smith Family’s work is evidence-led and strengthened by a network of strong partnerships with corporate and community organisations as well as individual sponsors, donors and volunteers, including the 20,000 members of VIEW Clubs of Australia.

== Volunteering ==
Each year, over 5,400 volunteers contribute to Smith Family programs across the country.

== Clothing donations ==
Until January 2020, The Smith Family operated clothing donation bins, into which people deposit used clothing. However, at the end of 2019 the charity announced on its website that it would cease operations in clothing recycling from January 2020. This was to allow The Smith Family to "focus solely on providing out-of-school learning support for disadvantaged young Australians".
