= Letitia Forbes, Countess of Granard =

British noblewoman (d. 1778)

Letitia Forbes, Countess of Granard (died 19 May (or 24 May or 26 May) 1778), formerly Letitia Davys, was the wife of George Forbes, 4th Earl of Granard. She was the daughter of Arthur Davys of Hampstead, Dublin, by his wife the former Catherine Stewart, daughter of William Stewart, 1st Viscount Mountjoy.

Letitia's mother Catherine was the sister of the Hon. Mary Stewart, also daughter of the 1st Viscount Mountjoy; Mary was the mother of George Forbes, whom Letitia married on 16 July 1736; he inherited the title on the death of the 3rd Earl in 1765, at which point Letitia became Countess of Granard.

The earl and countess had one son, George (1740–1780), who succeeded to the earldom on his father's death in 1769. After this, Letitia was known as Countess Dowager of Granard. She died at Brockley Court in Somerset.
