= Patrick Stuart (MP) =

Scottish officer in the British Army and politician

Patrick Stuart (c. 1682–1760) was a Scottish officer in the British Army and a politician.

Stuart was the second son of Alexander Stuart of Torrance and his wife Isabel, daughter of Sir Patrick Nisbet, 1st Baronet, of Edinburgh. James Stuart MP was his older brother.

Stuart joined the army in 1704 as an ensign in the 1st Foot, was promoted to lieutenant in 1707, and captain in 1727.

He was returned in the interest of the 6th Duke of Hamilton as the Member of Parliament (MP) for Lanarkshire at a by-election in 1750. He held the seat until the next general election, in 1754.

Stuart succeeded to his brother's estates in 1743, and died unmarried in 1760.

Parliament of Great Britain
Preceded by Sir James Hamilton of Rosehall	Member of Parliament for Lanarkshire; 1750–1754	Succeeded by James Vere
