= Lord Lieutenant of Longford =

Ceremonial officer in Longford, Ireland

This is a list of people who have served as Lord-Lieutenant of Longford.

There were lieutenants of counties in Ireland until the reign of James II, when they were renamed governors. The office of Lord Lieutenant was recreated on 23 August 1831.

== Governors ==
- George Forbes, 3rd Earl of Granard, 1740–1756
- George Forbes, 4th Earl of Granard, 1756– (died 1769)
- Thomas Gleadowe-Newcomen, 2nd Viscount Newcomen, 1801–1825
- George Forbes, 6th Earl of Granard, –1831

== Lord Lieutenants ==
- George Forbes, Viscount Forbes, 7 October 1831 – 13 November 1836
- Luke White, 22 November 1836 – 1841
- Henry White, 1st Baron Annaly, 1841 – 3 September 1873
- Luke White, 2nd Baron Annaly, 7 November 1873 – March 1874
- William Pakenham, 4th Earl of Longford, 27 March 1874 – 19 April 1887
- Thomas Pakenham, 5th Earl of Longford, 14 June 1887 – 21 August 1915
- vacant
- Bernard Forbes, 8th Earl of Granard, 26 August 1916 – 1922
