= John Forbes (Royal Navy officer) =

Royal Navy officer and politician (1714–1796)

Admiral of the Fleet The Honourable John Forbes
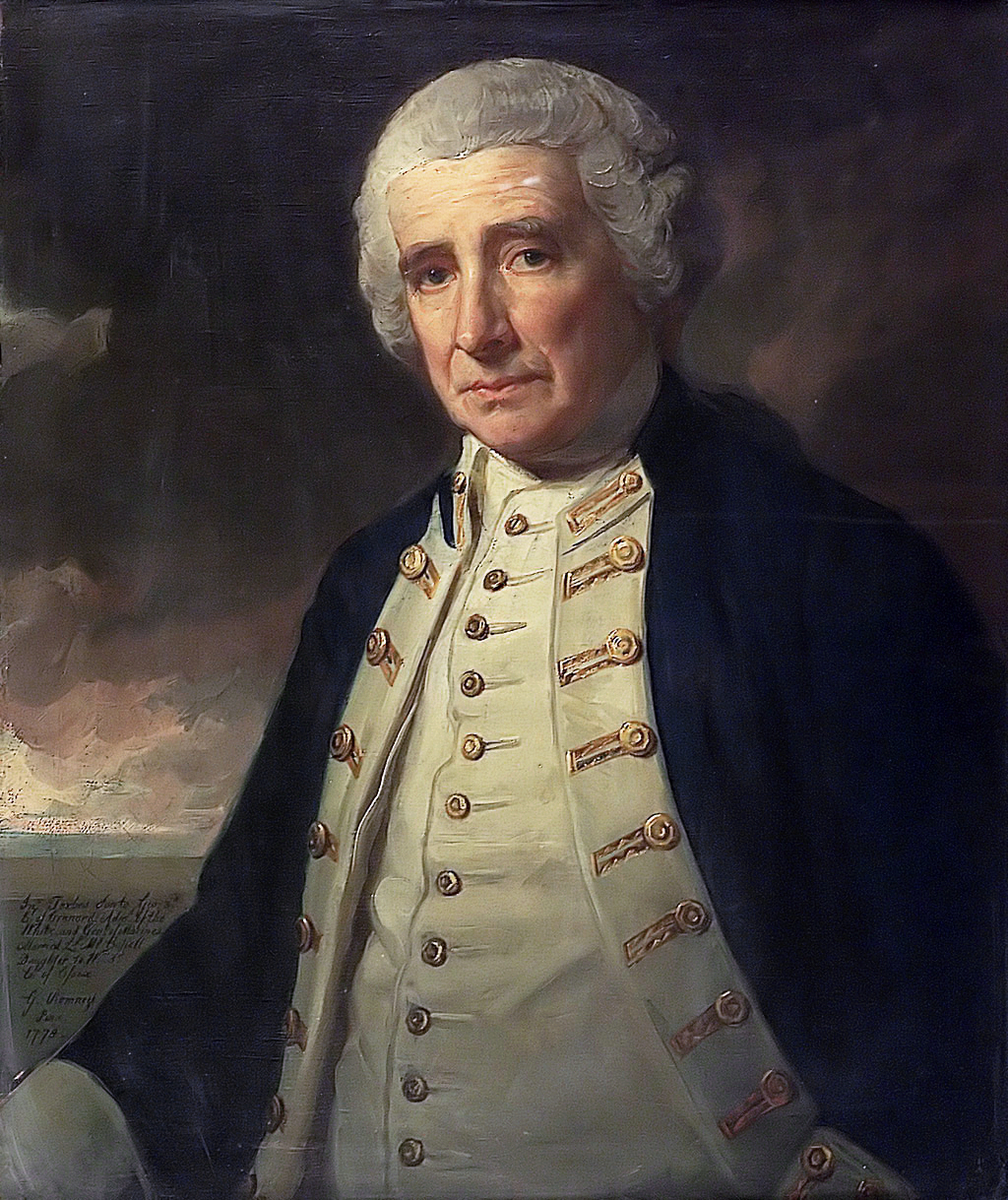
- Portrait by George Romney, 1778
- Born: 17 July 1714; Minorca
- Died: 10 March 1796 (aged 81); Savile Row, London
- Burial place: St Mary's Watford, Hertfordshire
- Military career
- Allegiance: Great Britain
- Branch: Royal Navy
- Service years: 1726–1796
- Rank: Admiral of the Fleet
- Commands: HMS Poole; HMS Port Mahon; HMS Severn; HMS Tyger; HMS Guernsey; HMS Norfolk; Mediterranean Squadron
- Conflicts: War of the Austrian Succession

Admiral of the Fleet John Forbes (17 July 1714 – 10 March 1796) was a Royal Navy officer and politician. After taking part in an expedition to Lisbon to support the Portuguese in the face of a Spanish threat, he saw action as captain of the third-rate HMS Norfolk at the Battle of Toulon during the War of the Austrian Succession. He was one of the few captains who really bore down on the enemy.

Forbes went on to serve as a Lord Commissioner of the Admiralty under successive governments. In that role, he was convinced of the illegality of the sentence of death on Admiral John Byng and refused to sign Byng's death warrant. He also served as Member of Parliament for St Johnstown and then as Member of Parliament for Mullingar in the Parliament of Ireland.

== Early career ==
Born the second son of George Forbes, 3rd Earl of Granard and Mary (the eldest daughter of William Stewart, 1st Viscount Mountjoy), Forbes joined the Royal Navy in the 70-gun third-rate HMS Burford on 31 May 1726. He served as a volunteer under the command of his maternal uncle, the Honourable Charles Stewart. He served with HMS Burford in the Mediterranean, before moving with his uncle to the third-rate HMS Lion, and the two sailed together to the West Indies in 1729. Stewart promoted Forbes to lieutenant, while serving there, on 16 March 1731.

Forbes became third lieutenant in the 60-gun fourth-rate HMS Kingston on 13 January 1733. He became fourth lieutenant on the larger 70-gun third-rate HMS Edinburgh early in 1734 and then joined the 100-gun first rate HMS Britannia as sixth lieutenant on 21 July, rising to third lieutenant by May 1735. The Britannia was at this time the flagship of Admiral Sir John Norris, and Forbes sailed with him on an expedition to Lisbon to support the Portuguese in the face of a Spanish threat.

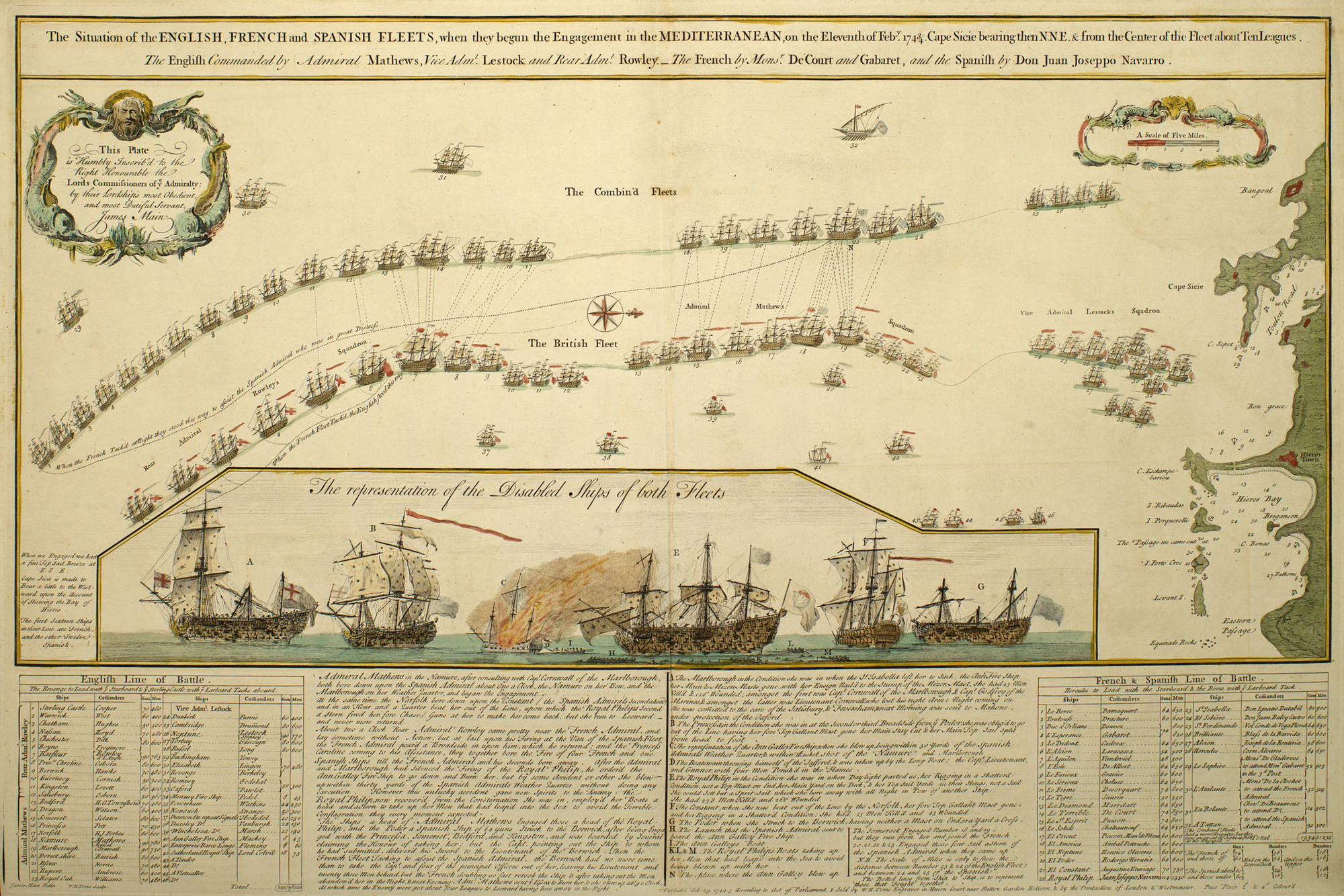
The Battle of Toulon, at which Forbes captained HMS Norfolk (marked as "17" in the British line of battle)

Norris promoted Forbes to commander on 7 March 1737 and appointed him commanding officer of the 32-gun fifth-rate HMS Poole. Forbes returned to England with Norris, escorting HMS Britannia. Promoted to captain on 24 October 1737, Forbes became commanding officer of the 20-gun sixth-rate HMS Port Mahon and was sent to serve on the Coast of Ireland Station in 1738. Forbes was appointed to command the fourth-rate HMS Severn at Plymouth in Summer 1739 and then moved to the fourth-rate HMS Tyger on 30 June 1740. He transferred to the 50-gun fourth-rate HMS Guernsey on 10 August 1740, just before she was relaunched at Chatham, and sailed her to the Nore.

Forbes was given command the 80-gun third-rate HMS Norfolk in 1742 and saw action at the Battle of Toulon on 11 February 1744 during the War of the Austrian Succession. He followed the example of Admiral Thomas Mathews, who was aboard the second-rate HMS Namur, and was one of the few captains who really bore down on the enemy. In Summer 1746 he was called upon to give evidence at the court-martial of Vice-Admiral Richard Lestock during the recriminations after the battle.

== Senior command ==
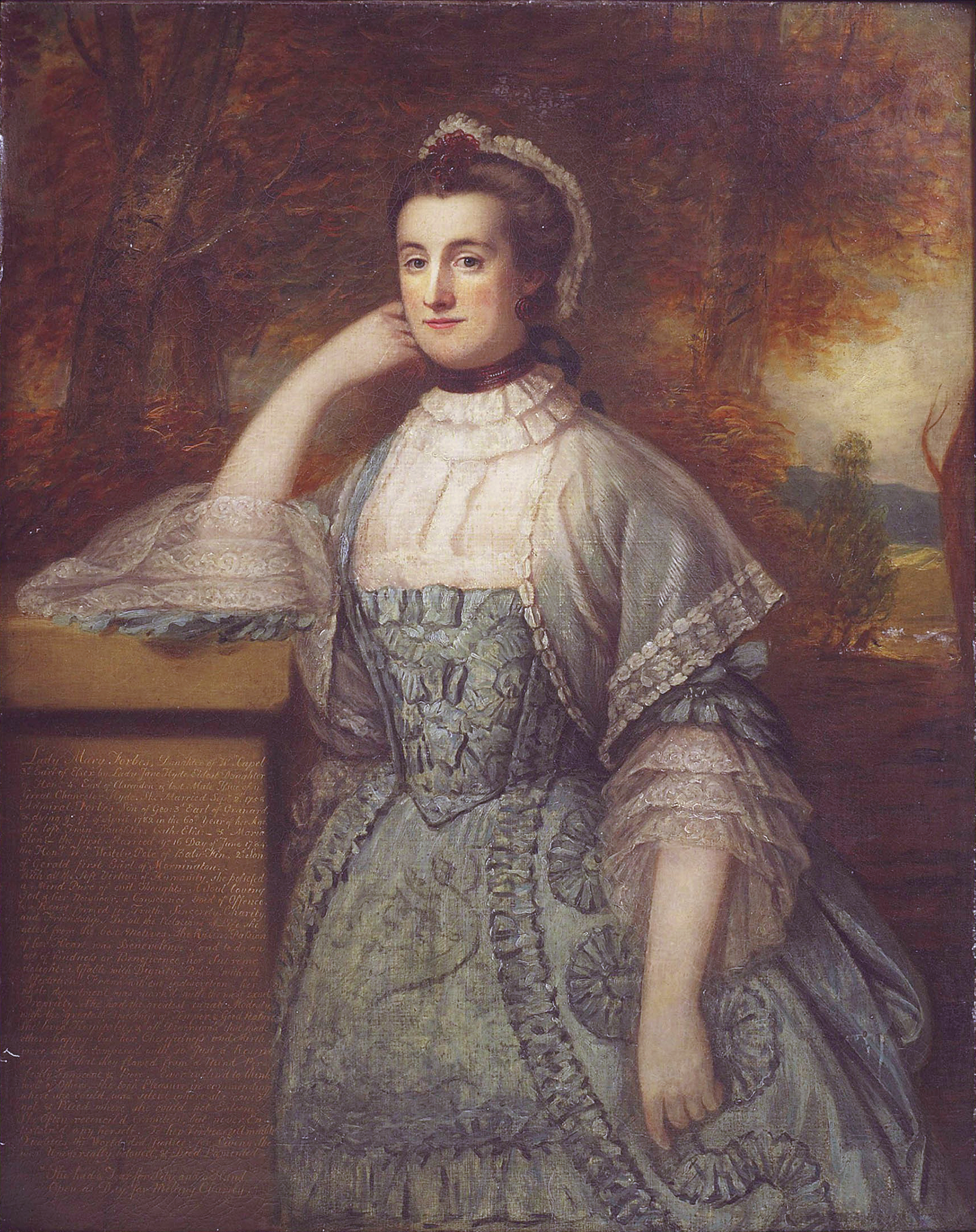
Mary Forbes, 1722–1782. (Nicholas Farrer, 1750–1805)

Promoted to rear-admiral on 15 July 1747, Forbes became second in command to Vice-Admiral John Byng in the Mediterranean and then took over command of the Mediterranean Squadron in August 1748. He was elected to the Parliament of Ireland, as Member for St Johnstown in 1751. Suffering from poor health he rejected offers to take a command in the East Indies and then a governorship in New York in 1754. Promoted to vice-admiral on 6 February 1755, he was appointed a Lord Commissioner of the Admiralty on the Board of Admiralty led by Earl Temple in December 1756. In March 1757 the execution of Vice-Admiral John Byng was held: Forbes was convinced of the illegality of the judgement and refused to sign the death warrant, instead attaching to the warrant a document explaining his refusal. A copy of the document, believed to be Forbes' draft, on three sheets of paper, is in the archives of the Society of Genealogists. Another copy, signed "J.F. 16 February 1757", is in the Senate House Library at the University of London. It was also published as a broadside.

After the Pitt–Devonshire ministry fell in April 1757, Forbes left the Admiralty but returned when the Pitt–Newcastle ministry was formed in June 1757. Promoted to full admiral on 7 February 1758, he received the sinecure of general of marines on 1 May 1758. From around 1760 he lived at No. 3 Savile Row in London. He served as Senior Naval Lord on the Admiralty Board from March 1761 to April 1763.

Forbes was elected as Member for Mullingar in 1761 and became Commissioner of the Board of Longitude in 1768. His final promotion was to Admiral of the Fleet on 24 October 1781 following the death of Lord Hawke. He died at his home in Savile Row on 10 March 1796 and was buried in the Essex family vault in the parish church of St Mary's Watford next to his wife.

== Family ==
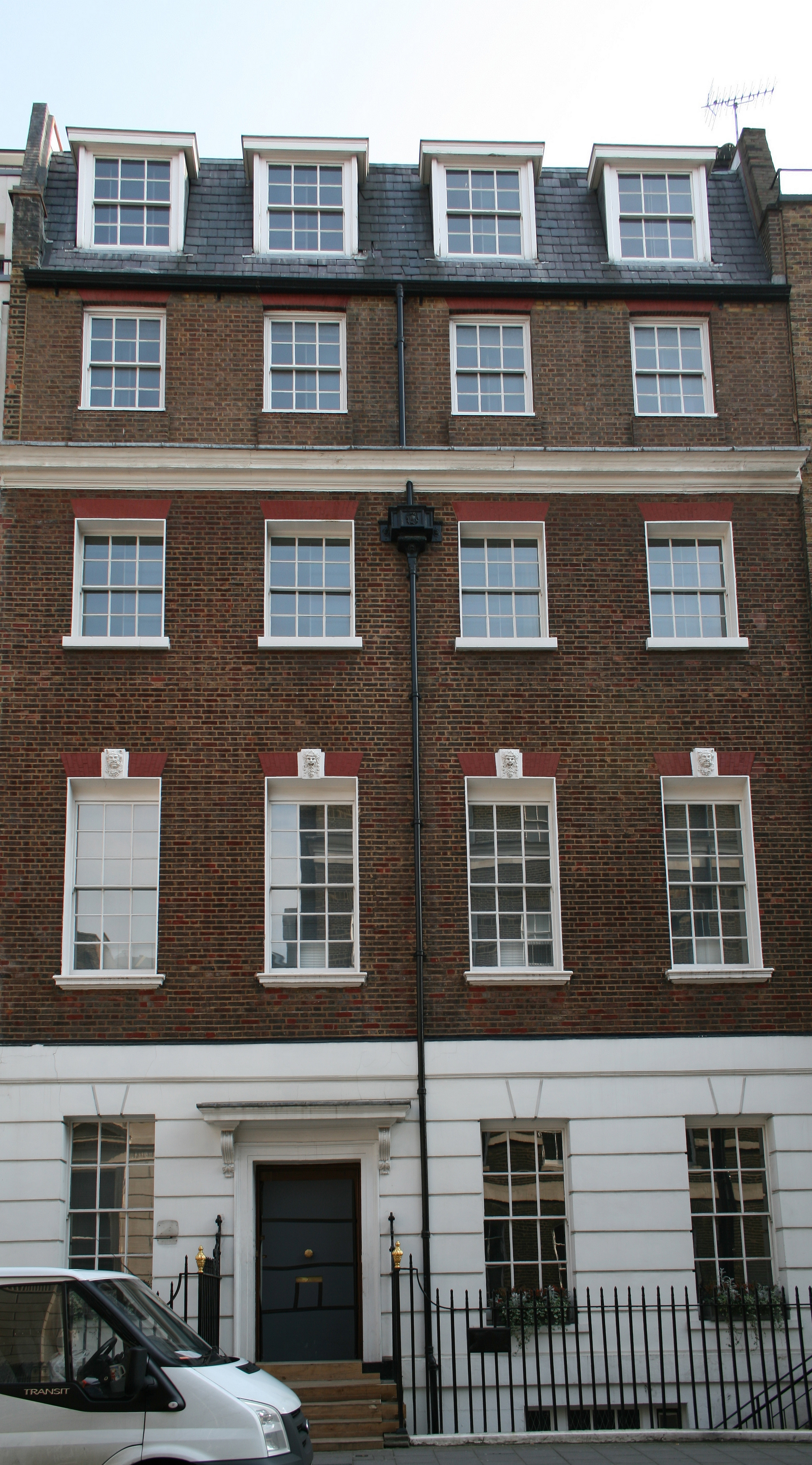
No. 3 Savile Row, Forbes' house in London

Forbes married Lady Mary Capell (1722–1782), the daughter of William Capell, 3rd Earl of Essex, on 2 September 1758. The marriage produced twin daughters, Katherine Elizabeth and Maria Eleanor, on 23 January 1761. Katherine, married William Wellesley-Pole, 3rd Earl of Mornington, while Maria married John Villiers, 3rd Earl of Clarendon.

== Sources ==
- Beaglehole, J.C., ed. (1968). The Journals of Captain James Cook on His Voyages of Discovery, vol. I:The Voyage of the Endeavour 1768–1771. Cambridge University Press. OCLC 223185477.
- Heathcote, Tony (2002). The British Admirals of the Fleet 1734 – 1995. Pen & Sword. ISBN 0-85052-835-6.
- Rodger, N.A.M. (1979). The Admiralty. Offices of State. Lavenham: T. Dalton Ltd. ISBN 0900963948.
- Wilson, Andrew (1807). Appendix to the Naval History of the United Kingdom. Cork.

Parliament of Ireland
Preceded by Henry Edgeworth; Thomas Newcomen	Member of Parliament for St Johnstown (County Longford); 1751–1761; With: Thomas Newcomen	Succeeded by George Forbes, Viscount Forbes; Charles Newcomen
Preceded by George Forbes, Viscount Forbes; John Rochfort	Member of Parliament for Mullingar; 1761–1768; With: George Forbes, Viscount Forbes 1761–1765; Richard Steele 1765–1768	Succeeded by Richard Steele; Ralph Fetherston
Military offices
Preceded by Edward Boscawen	Senior Naval Lord; 1761–1763	Succeeded by Richard Howe
Preceded by Sir Edward Hawke	Admiral of the Fleet; 1781–1796	Succeeded by Earl Howe
