= Action of 11 March 1727 =

Action of the Anglo-Spanish War of 1727–1729

- Part of the Anglo-Spanish War of 1727–1729
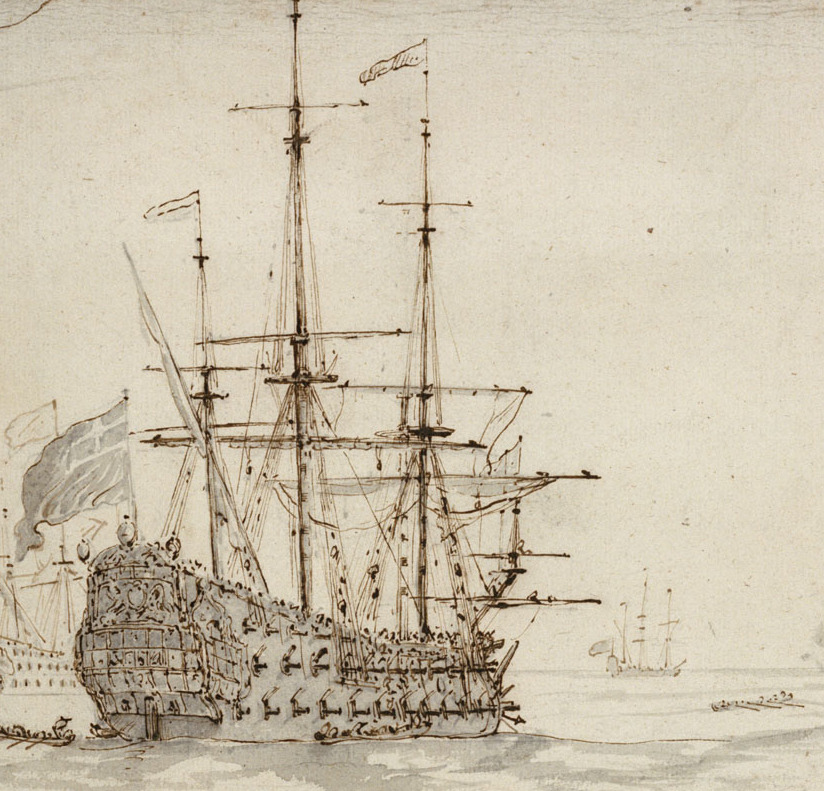
- Illustration of HMS Royal Oak made 53 years before the action
Date	11 March 1727
Location	Off Cádiz, Atlantic Ocean
Result	British victory

Belligerents
Great Britain	Spain

Commanders and leaders
George Forbes	Unknown

Strength
2 ships of the line	1 frigate

Casualties and losses
Unknown	200 killed or wounded 1 frigate captured

The action of 11 March 1727 was fought between the British and Spanish navies during the Anglo-Spanish War of 1727–1729. On 11 March the 46-gun Spanish frigate Nuestra Senor Del Rosario was out on sea trials after just being fully completed. The ship was bound from Santander to Cádiz. On the same day, HMS Royal Oak was out on a cruise with HMS Canterbury after being detached from a British squadron reinforcing Gibraltar from a Spanish siege.

Royal Oak and Canterbury sighted Nuestra Senor Del Rosario near Cádiz and gave chase. Soon Royal Oak caught up with her quarry and after a few broadsides the Spanish frigate soon struck her colours. Canterbury was not able to get up until Nuestra Senor Del Rosario struck. The prize was brought back to the British squadron, which managed to slip past besieging Spanish forces to relieve Gibraltar on 13 March.
