= James Stuart (1681–1743) =

Scottish officer in the British Army and politician

James Stuart (c. 1681 – 3 April 1743), of Torrance, Lanarkshire, was a Scottish officer in the British Army and a politician who sat in the House of Commons between 1734 and 1741..

Stuart was the eldest son of Alexander Stuart of Torrance and his wife Isabel Nisbet, daughter of Sir Patrick Nisbet, 1st Baronet, of Edinburgh. Patrick Stuart MP was his younger brother.

Stuart was educated at the University of Glasgow. He joined the army in 1704 as an ensign in the 1st Foot, was promoted to captain lieutenant and lieutenant colonel in the 3rd Foot Guards in 1724, and captain in 1725. His service included the War of the Spanish Succession, and the Battle of Sheriffmuir, where he was an aide-de-camp to the 2nd Duke of Argyll. After King George II took the throne, Stuart won a position in the royal court as a Gentleman Usher, which he held until his death.

Stuart was returned by the Duke of Argyll as Member of Parliament (MP) for Ayr Burghs at the 1734 British general election. There is no record of him voting in Parliament. He was not put forward as a candidate at the 1741 British general election.

Stuart succeeded to his father's estates in 1733, and died unmarried on 3 April 1743.

Parliament of Great Britain
Preceded by William Steuart	Member of Parliament for Ayr Burghs; 1734–1741	Succeeded by The Earl of Granard
