= St Johnstown (County Longford) (Parliament of Ireland constituency) =

Pre-1801 Irish constituency

St Johnstown
- Former borough constituency for the Irish House of Commons
- County: County Longford
- Borough: Ballinalee

–1801
- Replaced by: Disfranchised

St Johnstown was a borough constituency for Ballinalee or Saintjohnstown County Longford represented in the Irish House of Commons until 1800.

== Members of Parliament ==
Election	First MP	Second MP
1634	John Ware	Edmund Beagan
1639	John Ware	Dudley Loftus
1661	John Edgeworth	Sir Henry Piers, 1st Baronet
1689 Patriot Parliament	Sir William Ellis	Lt.-Col. James Nugent
1692	Sir John Edgeworth	Alexander Fraser
1695	Sir John Edgeworth	John Aghmooty
1703	Ambrose Edgeworth	John Aghmooty
1711	Anthony Atkinson	John Aghmooty
1713	John Kennedy	Robert Edgeworth
1715	Henry Edgeworth	Robert Edgeworth
1721	Henry Edgeworth	Robert Edgeworth
1727	Henry Edgeworth	Thomas Newcomen
1751	Hon. John Forbes	Thomas Newcomen
1761	George Forbes, Viscount Forbes	Charles Newcomen
1762	George Forbes	Charles Newcomen
1768	Ralph Fetherston	Charles Newcomen
1773	Ralph Fetherston	Robert Jephson
1776	Ralph Fetherston	Hon. John Vaughan
1780	Sackville Hamilton	Hon. John Vaughan
1783	Sir Thomas Fetherston, 2nd Bt	Nicholas Colthurst
1790	George Cavendish	John Taylor
January 1798	Sir William Gleadowe-Newcomen, 1st Bt	Francis Hardy
1798	Richard Lovell Edgeworth	William Moore
1801	Constituency disenfranchised	
