= Kingcausie =

Coordinates: 57.0910°N 2.2277°W

Kingcausie is an ancient estate in lower Deeside, Scotland. Once part of the Temple lands of the Knights Templar in Scotland, it passed in the 16th century into the ownership of the Irvine family.
