= Poppintree =

Locality within Ballymun, Dublin, Ireland

Poppintree Crann Phapáin
- Neighbourhood
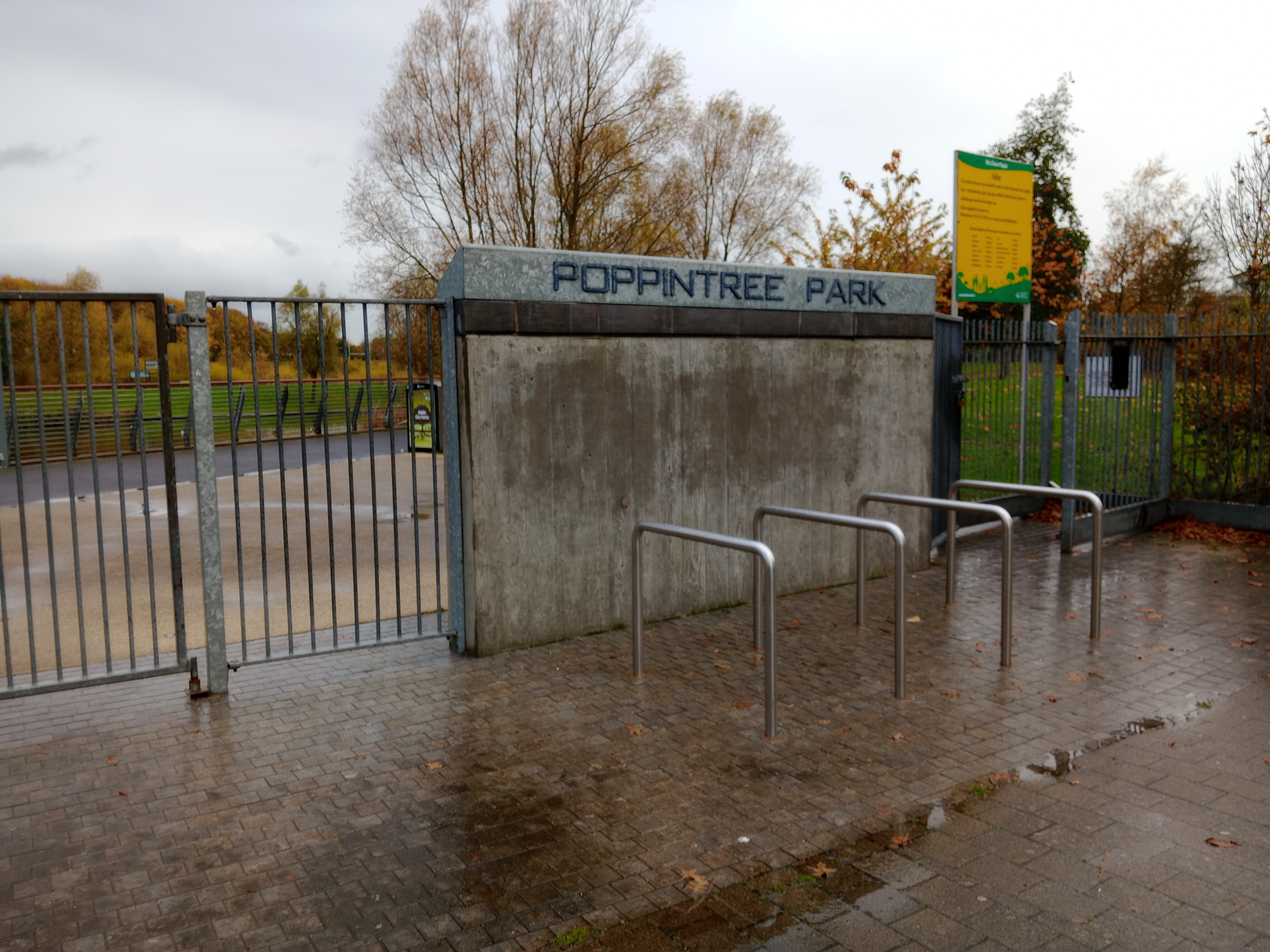
- Entrance to Poppintree Park (Entrance next to pond)

- Location within Dublin
- Country: Ireland
- Province: Leinster
- Region: Eastern and Midland
- City: Dublin
- County: County Dublin
- Local government area: Dublin City Council
- Time zone: UTC0 (WEST)
  - Summer (DST): UTC+1 (WEST)
- Eircode routing key: D11
- Dialing Code: +353(0)1
- Geocode: O142401

Poppintree (Irish: Crann Phapáin) is a townland and neighbourhood in Ballymun, a large suburb of Dublin, Ireland. It is principally bordered by other parts of Ballymun, and Finglas, and to a modest extent by Ballygall. The area includes Poppintree Park and the Poppintree Sports and Community Complex. The Republic of Ireland's only IKEA store is located here.

== Etymology ==
The name is derived from the townland in the civil parish of Santry (Ballymun was established primarily on Santry lands). It borders a smaller townland of the same name to the west of the parish of Finglas.

== History ==
Poppintree is derived from Pappan's Tree, named in honour of the 6th century abbot, Saint Pappan, who built a small chapel in Santry. The area was the site of a large tree under which was held an annual commemoration service to Saint Pappan on the last day of July. The services ceased by 1845.

== Transportation ==
Buses serving the area include routes 4, 13, 88n, 140 and 155 (operated by Dublin Bus), as well as routes 220 and N6 (operated by Go-Ahead Ireland).

== See also ==
- List of towns and villages in Ireland
