= HMS Sunderland (1694) =

Ship of the line of the Royal Navy

History

Great Britain
- Name: HMS Sunderland
- Namesake: Robert Spencer, 2nd Earl of Sunderland
- Ordered: 20 April 1693
- Builder: John Winter, Northam, Southampton
- Launched: 17 March 1694
- Fate: Sunk as a foundation, 1737

General characteristics
- Class & type: 60-gun fourth rate ship of the line
- Tons burthen: 91485/94 bm
- Length: 145 ft 2 in (44.2 m) (on gundeck), 120 ft 2 in (36.6 m) (keel)
- Beam: 37 ft 10 in (11.5 m)
- Depth of hold: 15 ft 10 in (4.8 m)
- Propulsion: Sails
- Sail plan: Full-rigged ship
- Armament: 60 guns of various weights of shot

HMS Sunderland was a 60-gun fourth rate ship of the line of the Royal Navy, launched at Northam in Southampton on 17 March 1694.

The Sunderland was hulked in 1715, and reported sunk as part of the foundation of a breakwater in 1737. However, an alternative report is that she was fitted as a hospital ship in June 1741 and so employed until condemned at Mahón on 10 March 1744.
