= Albert College Park (Dublin) =

Park in Ballymun, Dublin, Ireland

- Hampstead Park
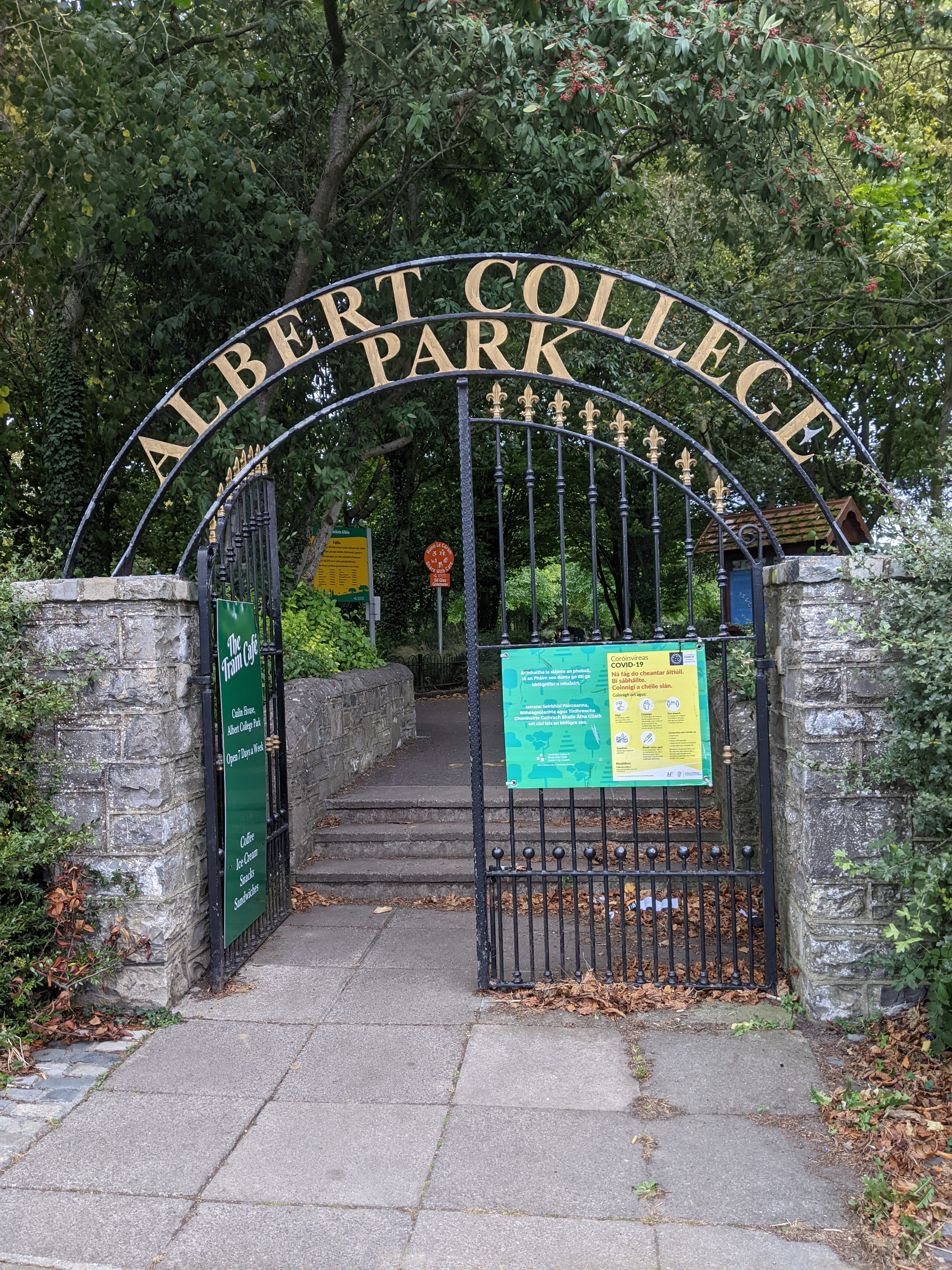

- Location within Dublin Location within Ireland
- Type: Municipal
- Location: Dublin, Ireland
- Coordinates: 53°22′55″N 6°15′45″W
- Area: 15 hectares (0.15 km^{2}; 0.058 sq mi)
- Established: 1838
- Etymology: Named for Prince Albert
- Operator: Dublin City Council
- Status: Open all year
- Website: Dublin City Parks - Albert College Park

Albert College Park (Irish: Páirc Choláiste Ailbhe), also known as Hampstead Park, is a public park owned by Dublin City Council and managed by the council's Parks and Landscape Services division. It is located in northern Glasnevin, in the mid-northern suburbs of Dublin.

== Location and access ==
The park is located on Ballymun Road in northern Glasnevin, next to the main campus of Dublin City University (DCU), and has been called an "oasis" in the area. It is bordered to the north and east by DCU, by Hampstead Private Hospital and the Elmhurst convalescent home to the southeast, Hampstead Avenue to the south, and Ballymun Road to the west.

== History ==
In 1838, approximately 50 acres were acquired in Glasnevin to found a model farm which would ultimately become Albert College Park. which was used to teach agricultural methods. The model farm was extended to 100 acres in 1847, with buildings added from 1851, and a nursery and garden from 1853. Prince Albert visited the model farm as part of his visit to Ireland with Queen Victoria in 1853, and he was so impressed that he sent a farmer from his own estates, John Pristo, to the model farm to train for a year. Following this, the institution took on the name Albert College. At this point, 50 acres were used for crops and vegetables, and 50 acres for livestock including dairy cattle.

When Albert Agricultural College was transferred to the Department of Agriculture in University College Dublin, Belfield campus in 1978, Dublin Corporation bought the college and 170 acres of farm land. Housing schemes in Ballymun and Poppintree were constructed on land near Collins Avenue. The college buildings ultimately became part of DCU. The cottages and former farm buildings were then used as a works depot with storage for machinery and equipment. Some of the cottages have been used as artists' studios.

=== Cuilín House ===
In the middle of Albert College Park is Cuilín House. This was the original building, used from 1838 by Glasnevin Model Farm (sometimes called The Glasnevin Institute) prior to its being renamed Albert College, and the development in 1851 of the larger, Albert College Building. Now part of DCU, it was used into the twentieth century as a residence for professors of the college. A listed building, owned by Dublin City Council, it was used by community groups for a while, however it fell into disuse and was boarded up. Sports changing rooms were developed on the site adjacent to the house.

In 2021, Dublin City Council installed public toilets and cafes in several parks around Dublin, including in Albert College Park. The toilets are located in the Tram Café, which opened in 2021 in the previously disused courtyard of Cuilin House.

== Sporting facilities and walks ==
The National Tennis Centre is based in the park. Established in 2003, with additional courts added in 2005 and 2008, the National Tennis Centre was developed replacing existing tarmac courts.

There are Gaelic football and soccer pitches, used by a variety of clubs, such as Na Fianna, Glasnevin Soccer Club, Stella Maris and Bohemian F.C. youth teams. There are Boules (pétanque) courts and a cricket crease.

A 3.5 km Slí na Sláinte exercise trail route links the park and the DCU main campus. The park is also a venue for junior parkrun.

There is also a children's playground and a "Native Tree Trail".

== See also ==
- Poppintree Park - nearby park in Poppintree, Dublin
