= 72nd Regiment of Foot (Earl of Berkeley's) =

- Active: 1745–1746
- Country: Kingdom of Great Britain
- Branch: British Army
- Type: Infantry
- Engagements: Jacobite rising of 1745

The 72nd Regiment of Foot was a regiment in the British Army from 1745 to 1746.

== History ==
In response to the Jacobite rising of 1745, the regiment was raised by Augustus Berkeley, 4th Earl of Berkeley in the County of Gloucester (or in Bristol). The Earl of Berkeley's Regiment of Foot received the number 72nd.

By 23 November 1745, the 72nd Foot was declared "half-complete" and soon considered ready for active operations. As of 25 January 1746, it mustered 769 NCOs and privates for an authorized strength of 780. In December, the regiment was ordered to head to Bristol where it joined the Regular 24th Foot as garrison. Contrary to a later legend, the regiment did not take part in the Battle of Culloden.

After the end of the war, the regiment was disbanded at Gloucester on 26 June 1746.

While most of the regiment raised by noblemen in 1745 had blue coats, the Earl of Berkeley's Regiment had red coats with green facings.
