= George Forbes (footballer, born 1868) =

Irish footballer

Personal information
- Full name: George Forbes
- Date of birth: 29 November 1868
- Place of birth: Canada
- Place of death: Canada
- Position: Full back

Senior career*
Years	Team	Apps	(Gls)
1887–1888	Limavady	?	(?)
1888–1889	St Columb's Court	?	(?)
1889–1892	Distillery	33	(1)
1892–1894	Glentoran	5	(0)
1894–1896	Distillery	21	(0)
1896–1898	St Columb's Court	?	(?)
Total		59	(1)

International career
1888–1891	Ireland	3	(0)
- * Club domestic league appearances and goals

George Forbes (born 29 November 1868) was an Irish international footballer who played as a full back.

== Career ==
Born in Canada, Forbes settled in Ireland (which was then part of the United Kingdom), and played club football with Limavady, St Columb's Court, Distillery and Glentoran.

He also earned three caps for Ireland between 1888 and 1891.

After finishing his playing career, Forbes returned to Canada.
