= George Forbes (philanthropist) =

- Born: 2 July 1915
- Died: 1 August 2006 (aged 91)
- Occupation: Philanthropist

George Kennedy Forbes (2 July 1915 – 1 August 2006), was an Australian philanthropist and women's advocate. In 1950, he was appointed General Secretary of The Smith Family, one of Australia's best-known not-for-profit organizations, and remained with that organization for 32 years. In 1972 he retired as General Secretary and became Honorary Director.

Seeing the need for women to have a greater opportunity to participate in Australian politics, in 1960 he founded the VIEW Clubs of Australia movement. Within the first year, 26 clubs were formed, in Sydney. According to the organization's magazine (No. 3, 2006), VIEW in 2006 had 23,000 members working in 400 communities across Australia.
