= HMS Lynn =

Four vessels of the Royal Navy have been named HMS Lynn after King's Lynn:

- HMS Lynn (1696) was a 32-gun Lyme group frigate, launched in 1696 and sold in 1713.
- HMS Lynn (1715) was a 42-gun 1706 Establishment frigate, launched in 1715 and broken up in 1732.
- HMS Lynn (1741) was a 44-gun 1733 Establishment frigate, launched in 1741 and sold in 1763.
- HMS Lynn (1889) was a passenger ferry, launched in 1889 as Lynx. In 1914 she was renamed Lynn, and then requisitioned as a minesweeper. She was returned to her owners in 1920, and scrapped in 1925.
