= Albert College (Dublin) =

Former agricultural college, now main campus of Dublin City University

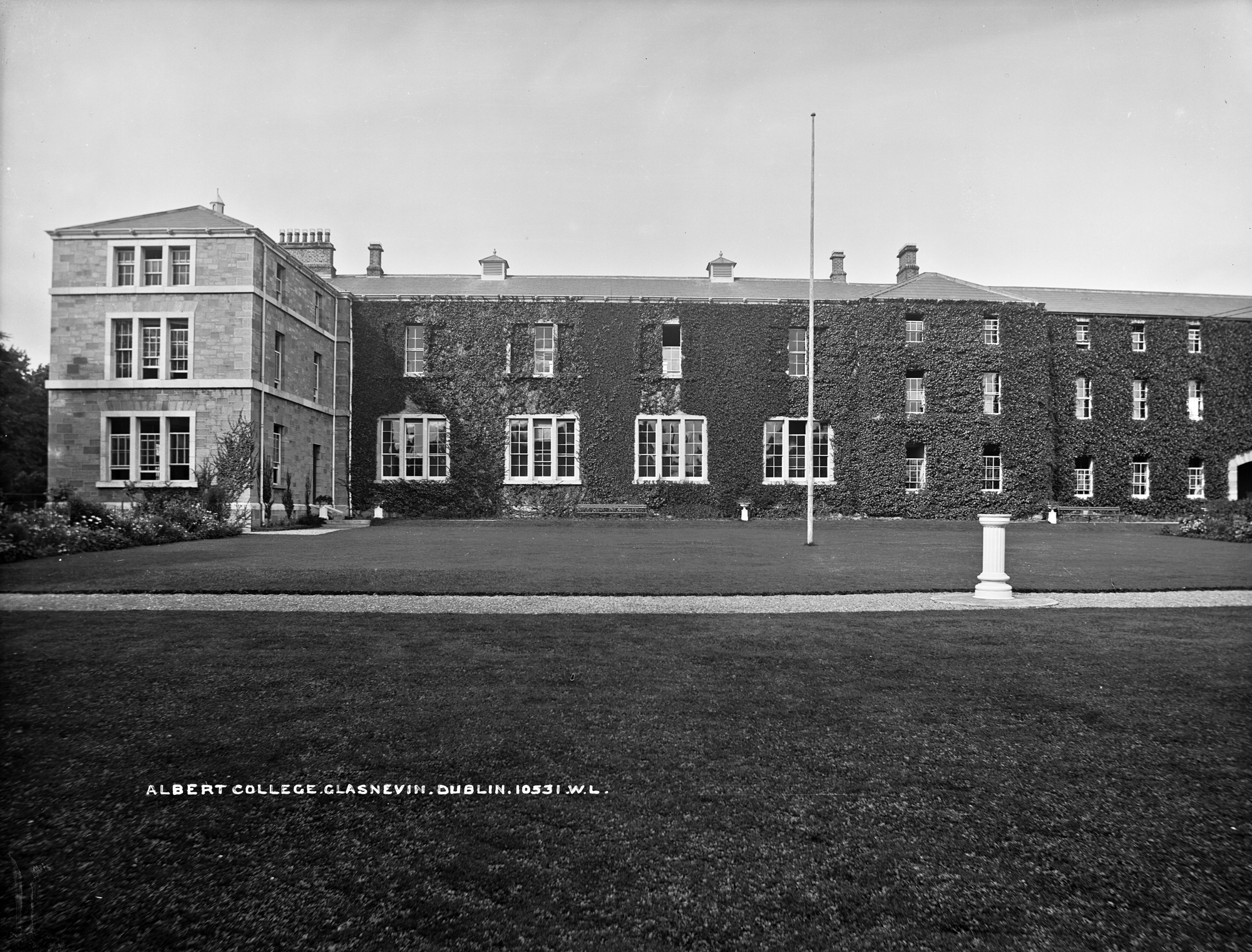
- Albert College building
- Established: 1838
- Location: Dublin, Ireland

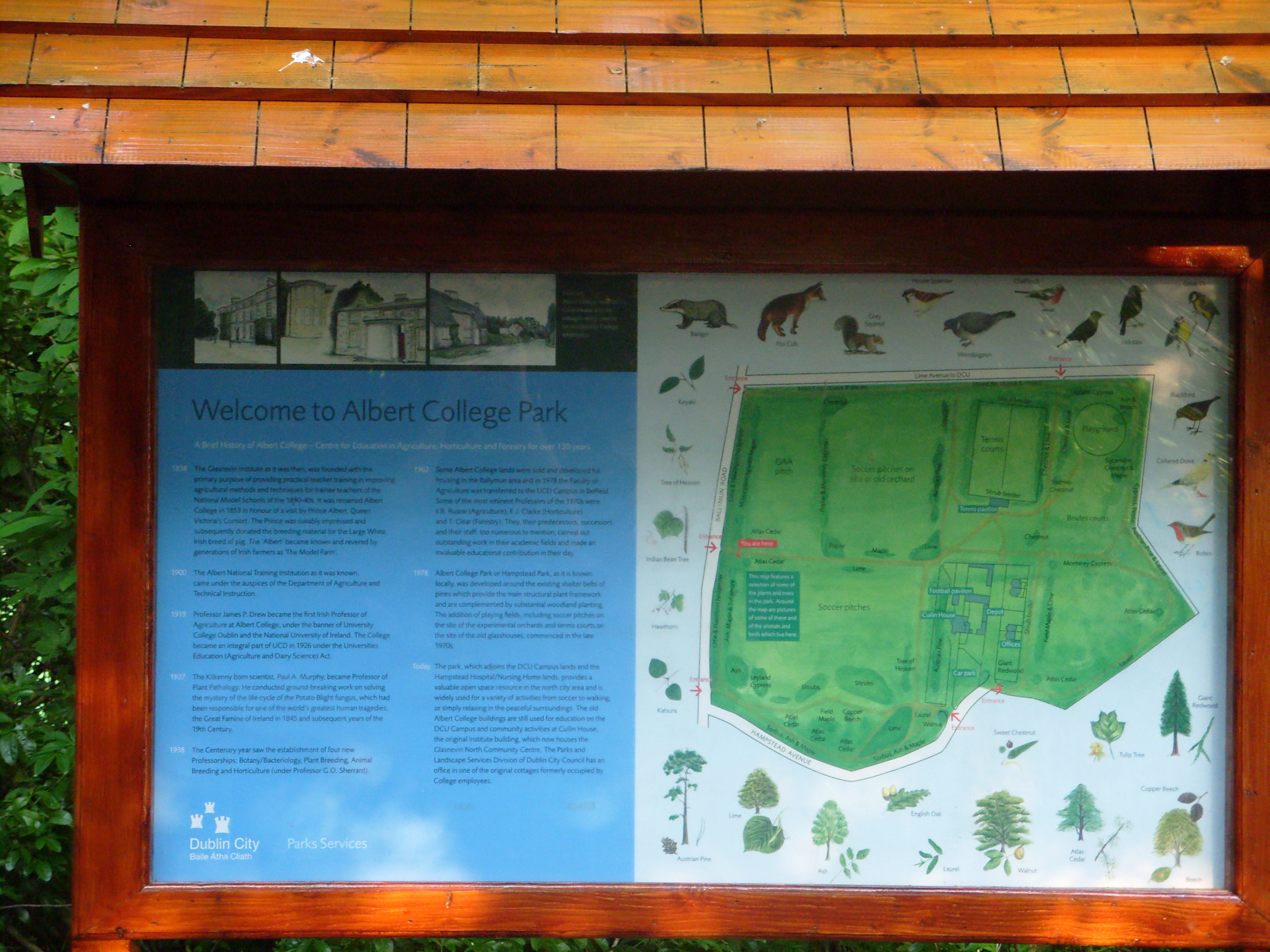
Information sign in Albert College Park with details about Albert College

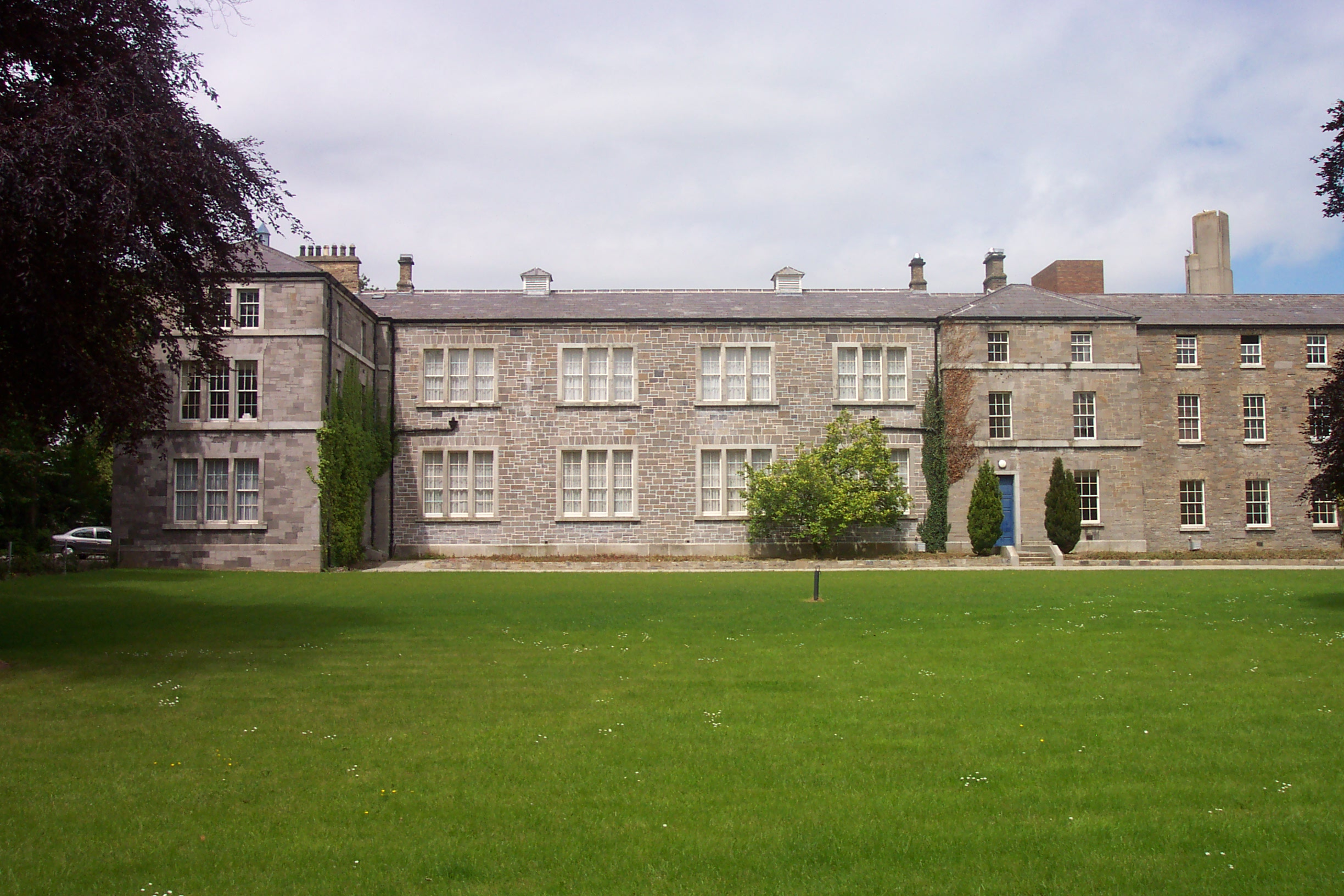
Front view

Albert College was an agricultural college in the northern suburbs of Dublin, Ireland. Today its former main building, known as the Albert College Building, built 1851, is the oldest building on the Glasnevin campus of Dublin City University and contains the offices of the university president, and other executive offices of the university. The Albert College Building also houses the 1838 Club, a restaurant for staff and postgraduate research students. The adjoining Albert College Extension, with laboratories for the school of engineering, was opened in 1985.

== History ==
=== Glasnevin Model Farm / Glasnevin Institute ===
In 1838, John Pitt Kennedy, the first inspector-general of the nascent Irish National School system, acquired land for the Crown for the specific purpose of building a central model farm and training establishment for National School teachers. The teachers were to be taught how to give instruction to children not only in reading, writing, and arithmetic but also in practical and innovative methods of agriculture. Albert College started life in 1838 as Glasnevin Model Farm, also known sometimes as The Glasnevin Institute. It was originally based in Cuilin House.

It was renamed the Albert National Agricultural Training Institution in 1853 after a visit by Prince Albert. The foundation of the college was an important event in the history of agricultural education in Ireland, which trained primary school teachers to the standards required by the Board of National Education in Ireland for the teaching of agriculture, additionally, it also trained those whose aim was to pursue a career in agriculture. The board established twenty model agricultural schools and provided many national schools with small holdings or gardens. Because of religious opposition and laissez-faire economic policies, the board was forced to discontinue support for the schools holdings in 1863 and in 1874 disposed of most of the model farms. Albert College survived, probably because it was not exclusively concerned with the board's educational policies—it also carried out research work in new crop varieties, farming methods and breeding livestock.

In 1902, the name Albert Agricultural College was adopted. In 1905, the west wing was added with residential accommodation, and the east wing in 1927.

In the early 20th century, Paul A. Murphy, Professor of Plant Pathology, made a significant scientific breakthrough in the study of Phytophthera infestans, the fungus which causes potato blight. In the definitive work on the Irish Famine—The Great Hunger—the author Cecil Woodham-Smith states that since Ireland suffered so much from the blight it was "by a stroke of poetic justice that it was in Ireland that much of the final research was carried out... at the Albert College in Glasnevin, Dublin".

=== University College Dublin ===
In 1926, the Faculty of General Agriculture of University College Dublin (UCD) moved onto the site as a result of the University Education (Agriculture and Dairy Science) Act, 1926, and the establishment became part of UCD.

In 1964, UCD approved the sale of 359 acres (145 ha) of the Albert College lands to Dublin Corporation, 212 acres (86 ha) of which were on a separate northern site which is now central Ballymun—the Albert College Park lands were also transferred to Dublin Corporation at this time and continue to be used as a public park. The sale occurred because the imminent transfer of the Faculty of Agriculture to Belfield became apparent, also a housing crisis occurred in Dublin during the 1960s as a number of old, dilapidated buildings collapsed in the city and land for housing near the city became urgently required.

UCD finally vacated the site in 1979.

=== NIHE and DCU ===
The fledgling NIHE, Dublin moved on site in 1979, vacating its inner city offices. In 1989, the NIHE became Dublin City University, and continued its capital development plan on the 50-acre (20 ha) former Albert College lands that it owns.

The original college building now contains the first floor offices of the university president, which look towards the official residence of the president, a lodge at the edge of the grounds. Also in the building are the offices of other senior officials of the university, and those of the institution's fund-raising body, the DCU Educational Trust, and the 1838 Club, a restaurant for staff and postgraduate research students. The adjoining Albert College Extension, with laboratories for the school of engineering, was opened in 1985.
