= Elizabeth Berkeley, Countess Berkeley =

British court official (c.1720 – 1792)

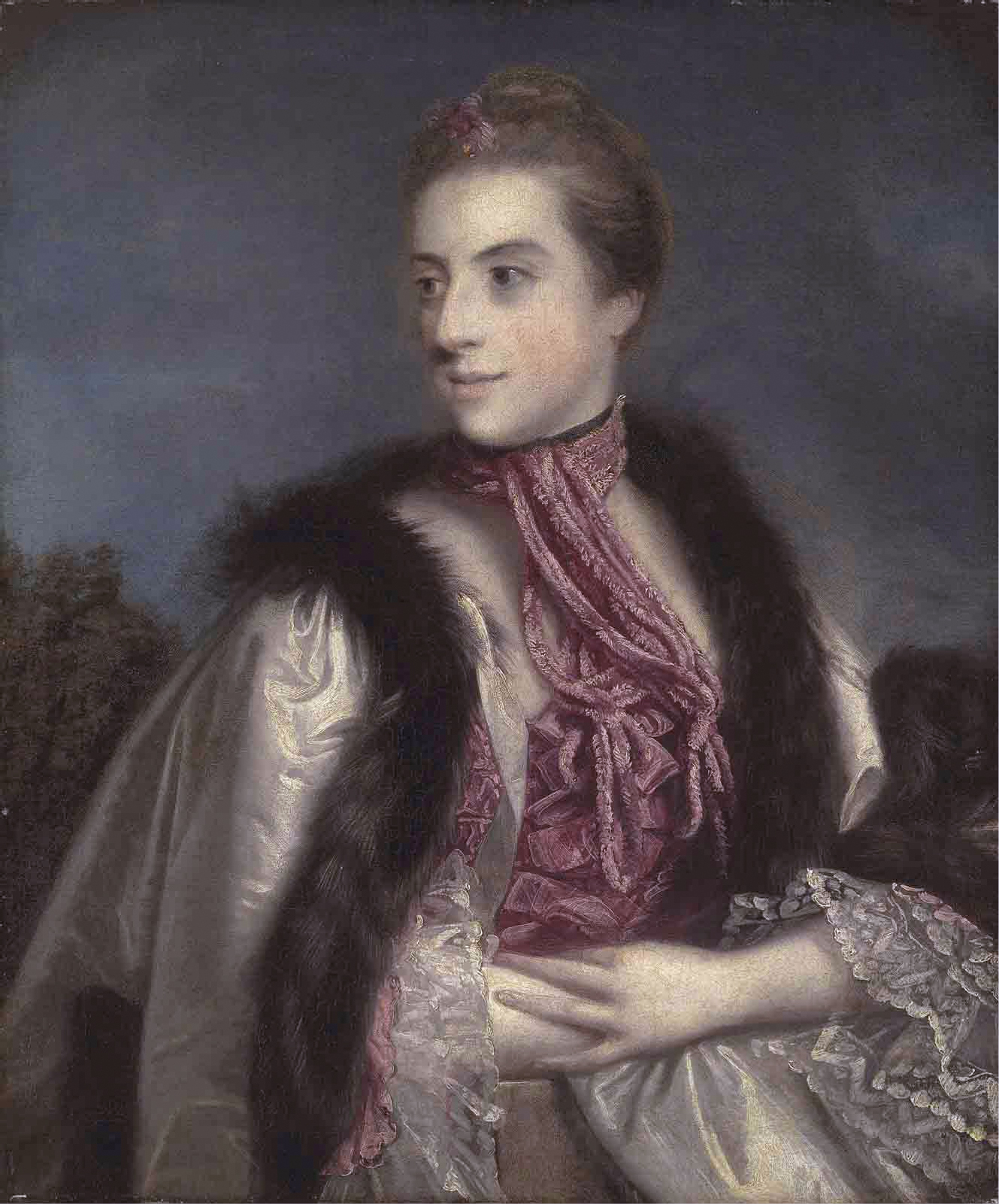
Elizabeth, Countess Berkeley, painted by Sir Joshua Reynolds c.1759

Elizabeth Berkeley, Countess Berkeley (c.1720 – 29 June 1792), formerly Elizabeth Drax, was a British court official, the wife of Augustus Berkeley, 4th Earl of Berkeley.

She was the daughter of Henry Drax and his wife, the former Elizabeth Ernle.

She married the earl on 7 May 1744. Their children were:

- Frederick Augustus Berkeley, 5th Earl of Berkeley (1745-1810)
- Lady Georgiana Augusta Berkeley (1749-1820), who married George Forbes, 5th Earl of Granard, and had children
- Lady Elizabeth Berkeley (1750-1828), a writer, whose first husband was William Craven, 6th Baron Craven, from whom she became estranged in 1780. Following his death, she married her lover, Charles Alexander, Margrave of Brandenburg-Ansbach.
- Admiral Hon. Sir George Cranfield Berkeley (1753-1818), who married Emilia Charlotte Lennox and had children

From 1745 to 1772, she held the position of Lady of the Bedchamber to the Princess of Wales (The Dowager Princess of Wales from 1751), Augusta of Saxe-Gotha. Following the earl's death in 1755, the countess remarried. Her second husband was Robert Nugent, 1st Earl Nugent, whom she married on 2 January 1757. They had two children:

- Mary Elizabeth Nugent, 1st Baroness Nugent (1758-1812), who married George Nugent-Temple-Grenville, 1st Marquess of Buckingham, and had children
- Lady Louisa Nugent (1758-1841), who married Admiral Sir Eliab Harvey and had children

The countess had her portrait painted in 1759 by Sir Joshua Reynolds. Following her death, she was buried with her first husband in Berkeley, Gloucestershire.
