= Poppintree Park =

Coordinates: 53°23′59″N 6°17′01″W

- Poppintree Park's ampitheatre
- Interactive map of Poppintree Park
- Location: Poppintree, Ballymun, Dublin
- Open: yes
- Designation: Regional park

Poppintree Park (Irish: Páirc Poppintree) is a regional park in Poppintree, Ballymun, Dublin, Ireland.

== History ==
A 50-acre regional park in Poppintree was proposed by Dublin Corporation in 1976. Initially, local resident associations Ballymun Avenue, Willow Park, Cedarwood Grove, Oakwood and Pinewood raised concerns about it not "catering for their recreational needs" but after a compromise with Dublin Corporation allowing the associations to "advise on the development of [Poppintree] park", most associations backed the proposal.

By 2008 the modern day area of Poppintree Park was wasteland. Redevelopment works began in 2008 as part of the Ballymun Regeneration, with it being officially opened by the Lord Mayor of Dublin in 2010.

== Facilities and environment ==
It has a GAA pitch, amphitheatre and playground, and a weekly 5km timed Parkrun is hosted in it.

It has wetlands, an artificial pond and wildflowers. In 2022, the Irish Independent reported that the pond was frequently polluted. Dublin InQuirer and Dublin People have also reported on pollution in the pond, with vandals intentionally polluting it in 2016 and 2017.

== Awards ==
Year	Award	Organisation
2012	Best Public Park	Local Authority Members Association
2022	Green Flag Award	Keep Britain Tidy
2023	Green Flag Award	Keep Britain Tidy
2024	Green Flag Award	Keep Britain Tidy
2025	Green Flag Award	Keep Britain Tidy

== Gallery ==
Poppintree Park's Green Flag Awards

A Scots Pine tree forming part of the park's tree trail

The pond

A Green Flag Award flying at one of the park's entrances

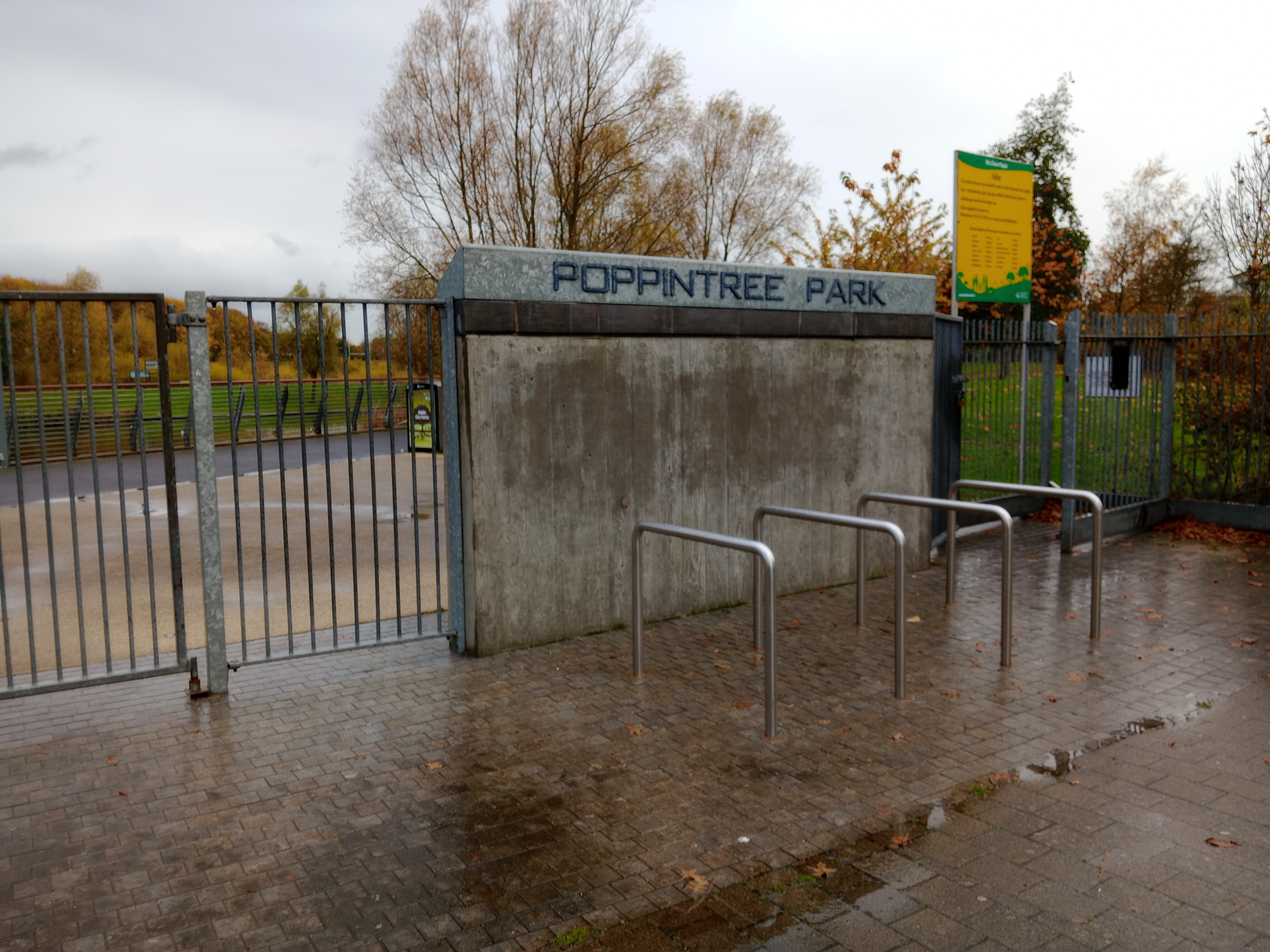
One of the park's entrances
