= William Stewart, 1st Viscount Mountjoy =

Irish soldier (died 1692)

William Stewart
- Viscount Mountjoy
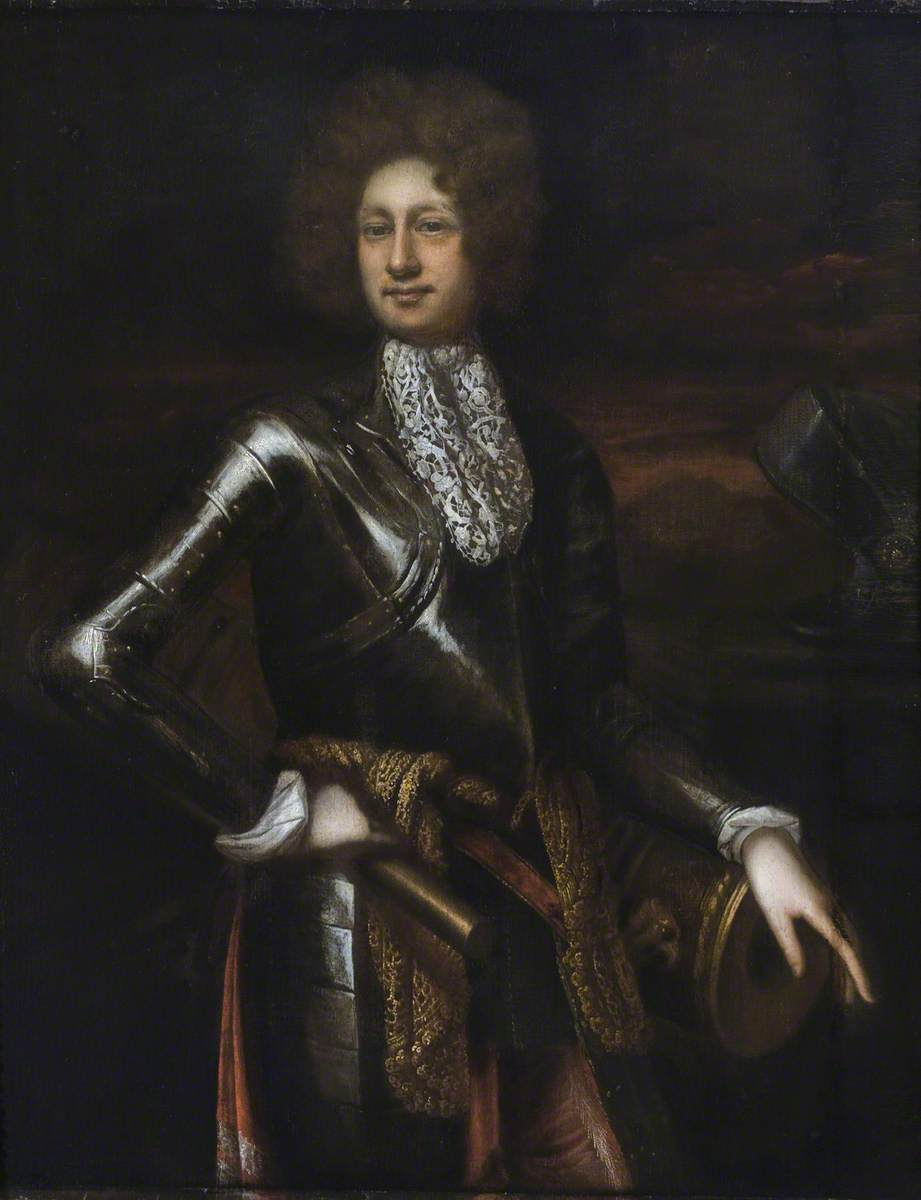
- Born: 1650 or 1653
- Died: 3 August 1692; Battle of Steenkerque
- Spouse: Mary Coote
- Issue: William and Charles
- Father: Alexander Stewart, 2nd Baronet, of Ramelton

William Stewart, 1st Viscount Mountjoy (1653–1692), was an Anglo-Irish soldier.

== Early life ==
William Stewart was born in 1653, the son of Sir Alexander Stewart, 2nd Baronet, of Ramelton. His family was from Donegal, Ulster Scots, and Protestant.

== Career ==
He was appointed master-general of the ordnance and colonel of a regiment of foot. In 1682 Charles II created him Viscount Mountjoy and Baron Stewart in the Peerage of Ireland.

In 1686 Mountjoy served the Holy League (1684) in Hungary at the Siege of Buda, where he was twice dangerously wounded.

On his return to Ireland, he was made a brigadier-general. Macaulay styled him "a brave soldier, an accomplished scholar". In Dublin he was the centre of a small circle of learned and ingenious men, who had, under his presidency, formed themselves into a Royal Society.

In 1685 Charles II died and King James II acceded to the throne. James started replacing Protestants in Ireland with Catholics. In 1687 James appointed a new viceroy: Richard Talbot, Earl Tyrconnell.

In 1688 James asked Tyrconnell for good Irish troops to defend England. These troops left in September and October 1688. Tyrconnell felt it necessary to replace these troops and decided to raise four new regiments: one for each Irish province. The regiment for Ulster was to be raised by the Earl of Antrim, a Catholic nobleman of Scottish origin. Antrim, already in his seventies, hired 1,200 Scottish mercenaries (i.e. redshanks), making sure they were all Catholics. The unit should have been ready by 20 November, but delays occurred.

In 1688, Mountjoy commanded the regiment stationed in Derry. During the Glorious Revolution he stayed loyal to James while most Protestants declared for the Prince of Orange. Nevertheless, Tyrconnell did not trust Mountjoy and sought to garrison Derry with more reliable troops. On 23 November 1688 Tyrconnell ordered Mountjoy to march to Dublin for embarking to England. He then sent Alexander MacDonnell, Earl of Antrim to occupy Derry with his newly raised regiment, but when Antrim eventually reached the city on 7 December, he found the gates shut against him by the 13 apprentice boys. This was the beginning of the Protestant revolt in Ulster. Tyrconnell then sent Mountjoy back to Derry. Mountjoy succeeded to strike a deal with the town on 21 December, and two of the companies of his regiment, consisting entirely of Protestants, were let into the town. Mountjoy became governor of Derry but soon delegated the office to Robert Lundy.

Despite this success, Tyrconnell decided to get rid of Mountjoy. He asked him to accept a diplomatic mission to France together with Stephen Rice. After some hesitations, Mountjoy agreed and he and Rice left for France on 10 January 1689. However, Rice had secret letters from Tyrconnell for Louis XIV that insinuated that Mountjoy should be arrested. He was accordingly thrown into the Bastille and kept there until 1692. While he was imprisoned, the Parliament of Ireland passed a bill of attainder requiring Stewart and two to three thousand others to report to Dublin for sentencing; Stewart in particular was directed to break out of the Bastille in order to report, under pain of being "drawn and quartered."

In April 1692 Mountjoy was exchanged for Richard Hamilton. On his release from the Bastille, he did indeed switch loyalties and joined William's army in Flanders as a General, losing his life at the battle of Steenkerque on 3 August 1692.

== Family ==
He married Mary Coote, daughter of Richard Coote, 1st Baron Coote. They had six sons and two daughters, including:

- Sir William Stewart, 2nd Viscount Mountjoy (1675–1728), who married Anne Boyle, daughter of Murrough Boyle, 1st Viscount Blesington, on 23 November 1696.
- Alexander Stewart, who had one daughter, Anne Stewart, his sole heiress.
- Mary Stewart (c. 1677–1765), who first married Phineas Preston (1672–1703, member of the Viscounts Gormanston lineage), aka Archibald Preston, of Ardsallagh, County Meath. After his death, she married Vice Admiral George Forbes, 3rd Earl of Granard (1685–1765).
  - Jane Preston (c. 1690–1746), who married Alexander Breckenridge (1686–1743), founder of the New England colonial Breckenridge/Breckinridge family
- Catherine Stewart, who married Arthur Davys (died 1733), an Irish Member of Parliament, representing Carrickfergus in the Irish House of Commons.
- Charles Stewart (1681–1741), who became an officer in the Royal Navy and a Member of Parliament

On his death in 1692, his title passed to his eldest son William.

Through his eldest son William, he was the grandfather of five boys and four girls, including William Stewart, 1st Earl of Blessington and 3rd Viscount Mountjoy (1709–1769). Through his daughter Mary, he was the grandfather of two from her first marriage, including Jane Preston (c. 1690–1746) who married Alexander Breckenridge (1686–1743), Col. John Preston (1699–1747), and three more children from her second marriage, including George Forbes, 4th Earl of Granard who married his cousin Letitia, daughter of Arthur Davys of Hampstead.

== Sources ==
- Childs, John (2007). The Williamite Wars in Ireland 1688–1691. London: Hambledon Continuum Press. ISBN 978-1-85285-573-4. – (Preview)
- Clark, Ruth (1921). Anthony Hamilton: his Life and Works and his Family. London: John Lane. OCLC 459281163.
- Lodge, John (1789). Archdall, Mervyn (ed.). The Peerage of Ireland or, A Genealogical History of the Present Nobility of that Kingdom. Vol. VI. Dublin: James Moore. OCLC 264906028. – Viscounts, barons
- Macaulay, Thomas Babington (1898). The History of England from the Accession of James the Second. Vol. III. London: Longman, Green, Longman, Roberts, & Green. – to 18 July 1689
- Newmann, Kate (1993). Newmann, Kate (ed.). "William Stewart (1650–1692): 1st Viscount Mountjoy". Dictionary of Ulster Biography. Belfast: Institute of Irish Studies, Queen's University of Belfast.
- Wills, Rev. James (1841). "Sir W. Stewart, first Viscount Mountjoy". Lives of Illustrious and Distinguished Irishmen, from the earliest times to the present period. Vol. III. Glasgow: MacGregor, Polson & Co. pp. 331–335. OCLC 1048786228.
- Witherow, Thomas (1879). Derry and Enniskillen in the Year 1689. London & Belfast: William Mallan & Son. OCLC 82779901.

Peerage of Ireland
New creation	Viscount Mountjoy; 1682–1692	Succeeded by William Stewart
Baronetage of Ireland
Preceded by Alexander Stewart	Baronet (of Ramelton); 1653–1692	Succeeded by William Stewart
