= Augustus Berkeley, 4th Earl of Berkeley =

English noble (1715–1755)

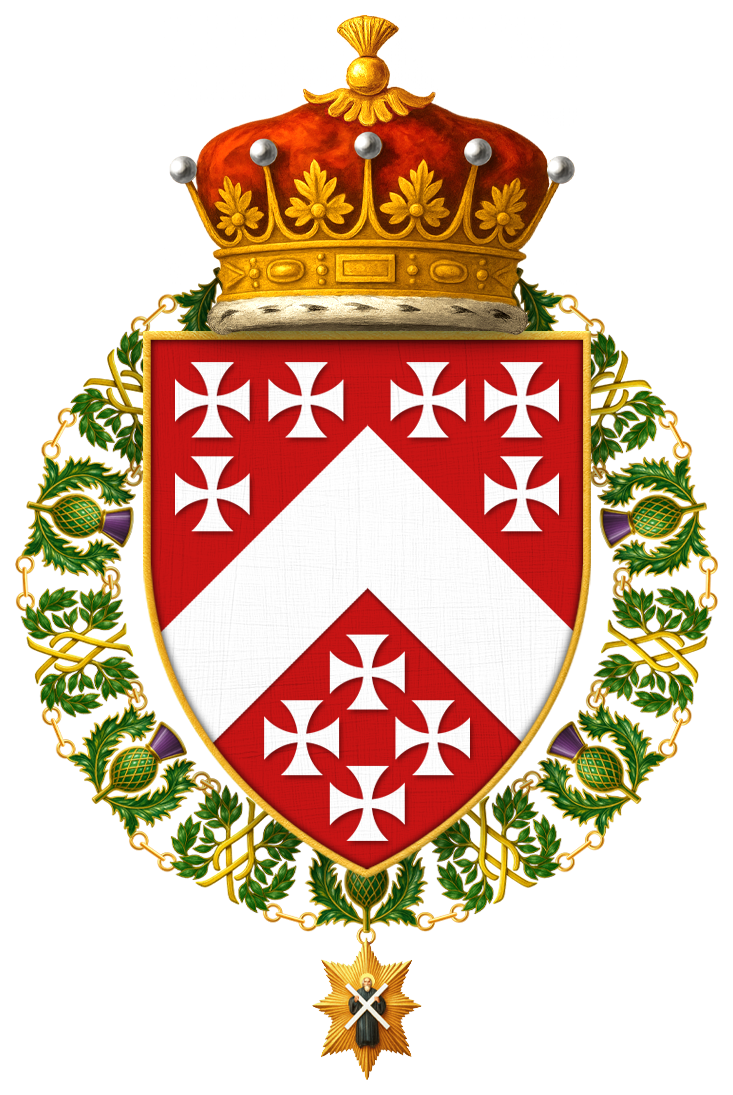
Shield of arms of Augustus Berkeley, 4th Earl of Berkeley, KT, encircled with the collar of the Order of the Thistle

Lieutenant-Colonel Augustus Berkeley, 4th Earl of Berkeley, KT (18 February 1715 – 9 January 1755) was the son of Vice-Admiral James Berkeley, 3rd Earl of Berkeley, and the former Lady Louisa Lennox.

== Biography ==
He was made an ensign in the 1st Regiment of Foot Guards in November 1734, and succeeded his father on 17 August 1736 as 4th Earl of Berkeley, 12th Baron Berkeley and 4th Viscount Dursley. In 1737, he was created Lord Lieutenant of Gloucestershire and Constable of St. Briavel's Castle, offices which he held until his death, and was made lieutenant-colonel of the 2nd Regiment of Foot Guards. On 9 June 1739, he was invested as a knight of the Order of the Thistle. In October of that same year, the Foundling Hospital received its royal charter, a charity for which Berkeley was a founding governor. During the Jacobite rising of 1745, he raised the 72nd Regiment of Foot.

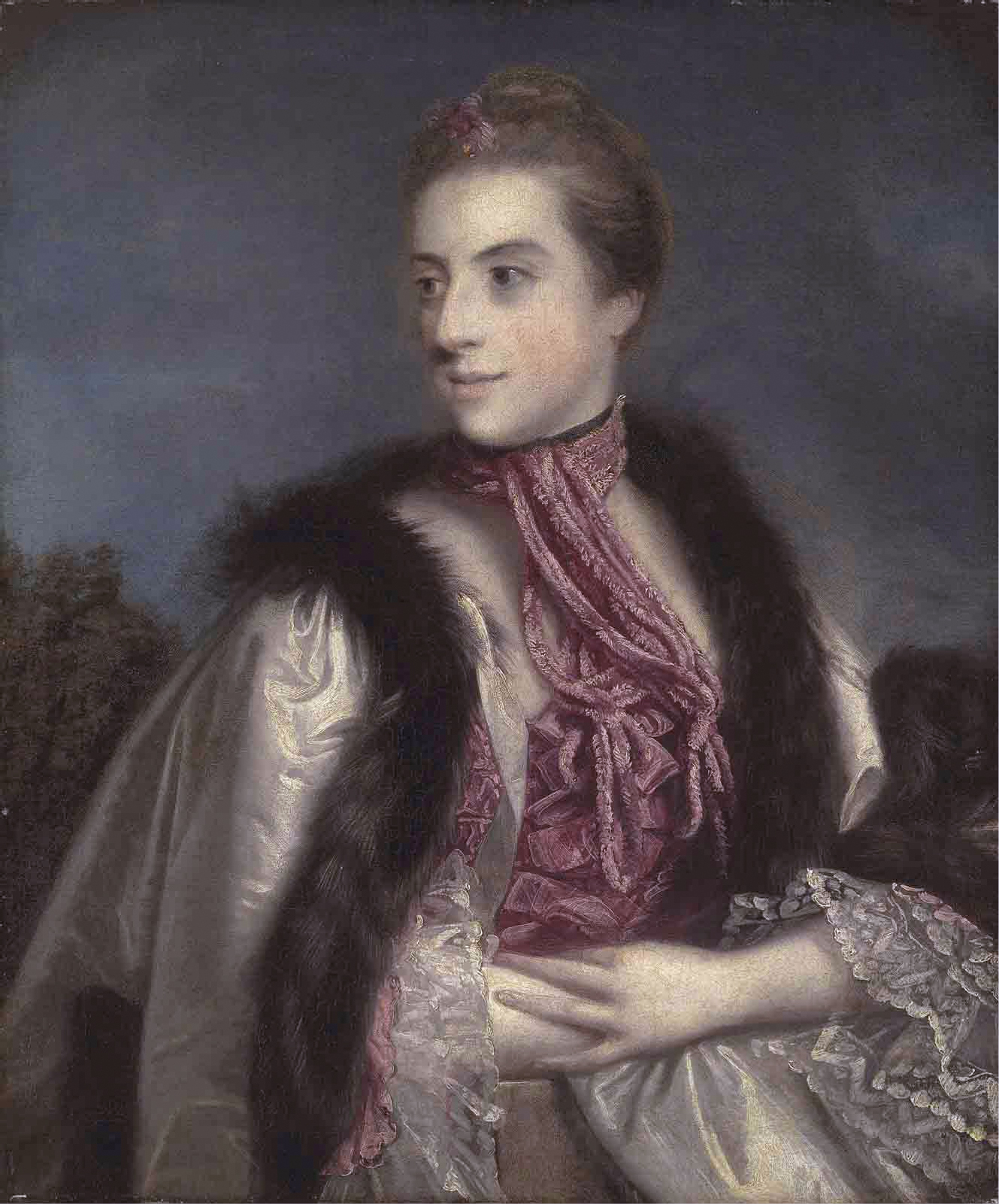
Elizabeth Drax (Joshua Reynolds)

From 1738 until 1741, he was having a well-known relationship with the already married Frances Vane, Viscountess Vane. He married Elizabeth Drax, daughter of Henry Drax and Elizabeth Ernle, on 7 May 1744. They had at least three sons, including Frederick Augustus, 5th Earl of Berkeley and George Cranfield Berkeley, and a daughter, Elizabeth Craven. The earl died on 9 January 1755 and was buried on 17 January 1755 at Berkeley, Gloucestershire. His wife, Elizabeth, was buried at St James's Church, Piccadilly, on 6 January 1777.

== Arms ==
Coat of arms of Augustus Berkeley, 4th Earl of Berkeley
Crest A mitre, gules, labelled and garnished or, charged with a chevron and crosses-patée, as in the arms. Escutcheon Gules a chevron between ten crosses patee, six in chief and four in base, argent. Supporters Two lions, argent, the sinister ducally crowned gules, collared and chained gold. Motto Dieu avec nous (God with us). Orders The Most Ancient and Most Noble Order of the Garter - Knight (KT).

Honorary titles
Preceded by The Earl of Berkeley	Lord Lieutenant and Vice-Admiral of Gloucestershire; 1737–1755	Succeeded by The Lord Ducie
Peerage of England
Preceded by James Berkeley	Earl of Berkeley; 1736–1755	Succeeded by Frederick Berkeley
