= 72nd Regiment of Foot (Invalids) =

- Active: 1757 – 1768
- Country: Kingdom of Great Britain (1757–1768)
- Branch: Army
- Type: Line Infantry

The 72nd Regiment of Foot (Invalids) was a British Army regiment raised from invalids for service in the Seven Years' War. The regiment was raised in Germany in 1757 as the 82nd Regiment of Foot (Invalids) by Major-General John Parker, who remained its colonel throughout its existence. It was re-numbered the 72nd Regiment of Foot (Invalids) in 1764 and disbanded in 1768.
