= Katherine Wellesley-Pole, Countess of Mornington =

Katherine Wellesley-Pole, Countess of Mornington (23 January 1761 – 23 October 1851), formerly Katherine Elizabeth Forbes, was the wife of William Wellesley-Pole, 3rd Earl of Mornington.

Katherine was the daughter and co-heir of Admiral Hon. John Forbes and his wife, the former Lady Mary Capell, daughter of William Capell, 3rd Earl of Essex. Her sister, Maria, became Countess of Clarendon.

On 17 May 1784, in London, she married Wellesley-Pole, then known as William Wesley-Pole. The earl and countess had one son and three daughters:

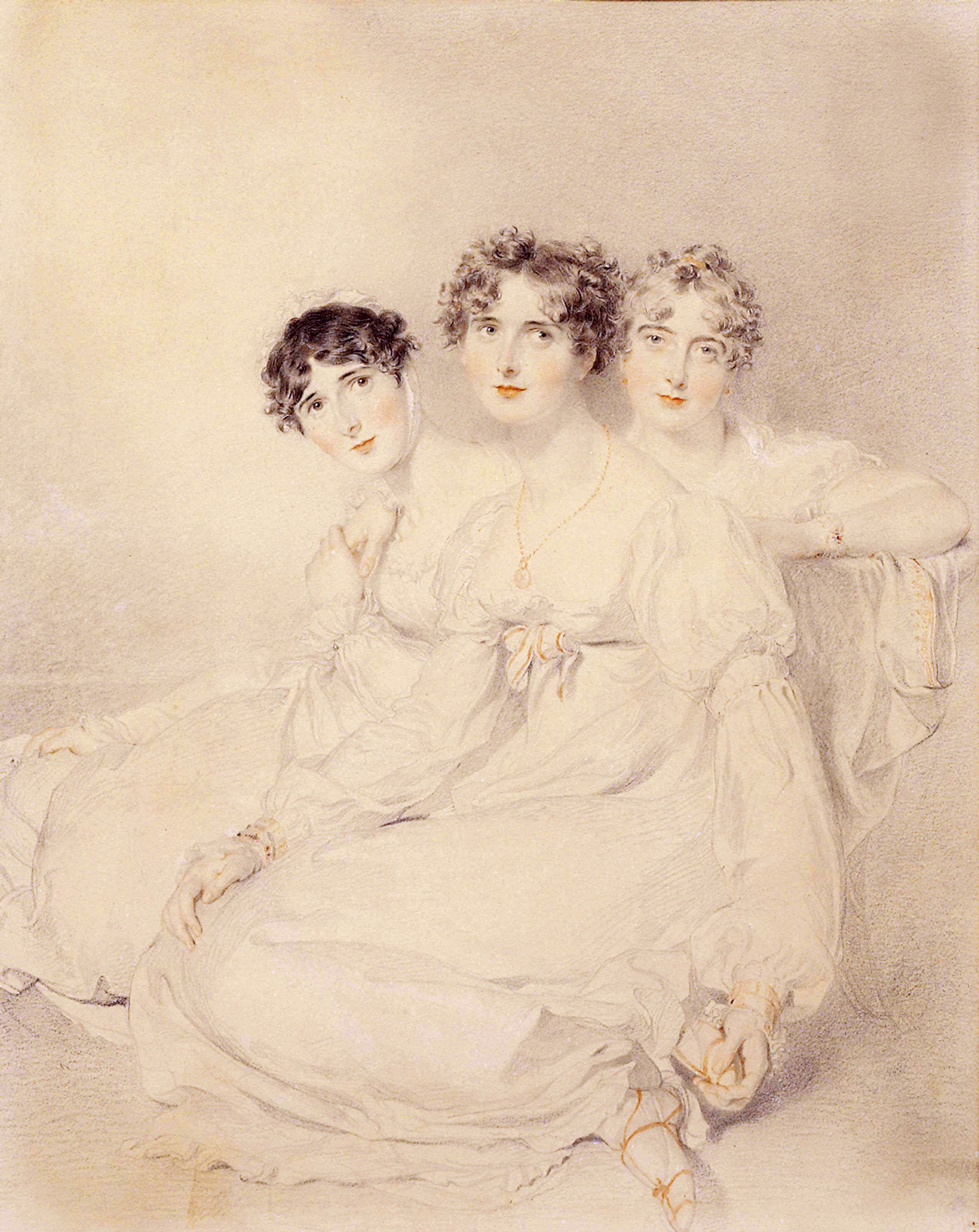
The Wellesley-Pole daughters by Thomas Lawrence L-R: Mary Charlotte Anne, Emily Harriet and Priscilla Anne

- William Pole-Tylney-Long-Wellesley, 4th Earl of Mornington, who inherited his father's titles.
- Lady Mary Charlotte Anne Wellesley (d.1845), who married Right Hon. Sir Charles Bagot, Bart., G.C.B., on 22 July 1806. The couple had three sons and five daughters.
- Lady Emily Harriet (1792–1881), who in 1814 married Lord FitzRoy Somerset, later 1st Baron Raglan, and had children
- Lady Priscilla Anne (1793–1879), who married John Fane, Lord Burghersh, later 11th Earl of Westmorland, and had children.

In 1789, Wesley-Pole changed the spelling of his surname to Wellesley-Pole, in keeping with the practice of other family members. In 1821, he became Baron Maryborough, and his wife became Lady Maryborough. In 1842, when he inherited the earldom of Mornington from his older brother, Richard Wellesley, Katherine became Countess of Mornington.

Following the earl's death in 1845, the earldom passed to their eldest son. The countess died at her London home in Grosvenor Square, and was buried with her husband and other members of the family at Grosvenor Chapel.

A watercolour portrait of the countess, by William Wood, was given by her to her daughter Emily in 1844.
