= Arthur Davys =

Irish Member of Parliament

Arthur Davys (died October 1733) was an Irish Member of Parliament, representing Carrickfergus in the Irish House of Commons from 1713 to 1714.

He married Catherine, daughter of William Stewart, 1st Viscount Mountjoy, by his wife Mary, daughter of Richard Coote, 1st Baron Coote; their daughter Letitia married her cousin George Forbes, 4th Earl of Granard.
