= Maria Villiers, Countess of Clarendon =

Maria Eleanor Villiers, Countess of Clarendon (23 January 1761 – 18 March 1844), formerly Maria Eleanor Forbes, was the wife of John Villiers, 3rd Earl of Clarendon.

Maria was the daughter and co-heir of Admiral Hon. John Forbes and his wife, the former Lady Mary Capell, daughter of William Capell, 3rd Earl of Essex. Her mother and the earl's mother being sisters, she and the earl were first cousins. They married on 5 January 1791, and had one daughter, Mary-Harriet, who never married and died in 1838.

The earl died in 1838 and was succeeded by his nephew. The countess died, aged 83, at Clarendon House, North Audley Street, Westminster.

A miniature portrait of the countess was painted on ivory by Richard Cosway.
