= George Forbes, 4th Earl of Granard =

Irish soldier and politician

Lieutenant-General The Right Honourable The Earl of Granard

Member of the Irish House of Commons for Mullingar
- In office 1749–1765 Serving with John Rochfort, Hon. John Forbes
- Preceded by: Sir Arthur Acheson, 5th Bt
- Succeeded by: Richard Steele

Personal details
- Born: George Forbes; 15 March 1710
- Died: 16 October 1769 (aged 59)
- Spouse: Letitia Davys (m. 1736)
- Relations: John Forbes (brother); William Stewart, 1st Viscount Mountjoy (grandfather); Arthur Forbes, 2nd Earl of Granard (grandfather)
- Children: George Forbes, 5th Earl of Granard
- Parent: George Forbes, 3rd Earl of Granard

George Forbes, 4th Earl of Granard (15 March 1710 – 16 October 1769) was an Irish soldier and politician.

== Early life ==
He was the eldest son of George Forbes, 3rd Earl of Granard by his wife Mary, daughter of William Stewart, 1st Viscount Mountjoy; while heir-apparent to the earldom he was styled Viscount Forbes.

== Career ==
Forbes entered the Army in 1726, and served as Quartermaster-General in Ireland from 1754 to 1757. He was lieutenant-colonel in the Tangier Regiment in 1756, then colonel of the 76th Regiment of Foot the same year. He was promoted to major-general in 1759, transferred to the colonelcy of the 29th Regiment of Foot in 1761, and was promoted lieutenant-general in 1765.

Besides his military career, Forbes sat in the Irish House of Commons for Mullingar from 1749 until he succeeded to his father's seat in the Irish House of Lords in 1765. He was a Governor of County Longford from 1756 and Custos Rotulorum of Longford from 1765 until his death.

== Personal life ==
On 16 July 1736 Forbes was married to his cousin Letitia Davys, daughter of Arthur Davys of Hampstead by his wife Catherine, daughter of the 1st Viscount Mountjoy. They had one son:

- George Forbes, 5th Earl of Granard (1740–1780), who married Dorothea Bayly in 1759. She was the second daughter of Sir Nicholas Bayly, 2nd Baronet of Plas Newydd and Caroline Paget (daughter and heiress of Brig.-Gen. Thomas Paget, Governor of Minorca). Dorothea's brother was Henry Paget, 1st Earl of Uxbridge. After Dorothea's death in 1764, he married Lady Georgiana Augusta Berkeley, eldest daughter of Augustus Berkeley, 4th Earl of Berkeley.

Lord Granard died on 16 October 1769 and was succeeded in his earldom by his only son, George. His widow, Lady Granard, died on 19 May 1778.

== Coat of arms ==
Coat of arms of George Forbes, 4th Earl of Granard
Coronet A coronet of an Earl Crest Azure three Bears' Heads couped Argent muzzled Gules. Escutcheon A Bear statant Argent guttée de sang muzzled Gules. Supporters Dexter: an Unicorn Erminois armed maned tufted and unguled Or; Sinister: a Dragon wings expanded Ermine. Motto Fax Mentis Incendium Gloriae (The incitement to glory is the firebrand of the mind)

Military offices
Preceded by George Boscawen	Colonel of the 29th Regiment of Foot; 1761–1769	Succeeded by Hon. William Evelyn
Peerage of Ireland
Preceded by George Forbes	Earl of Granard; 1765–1769	Succeeded by George Forbes
Preceded by George Forbes	Viscount Granard; 1765–1769	Succeeded by George Forbes
Baronetage of Nova Scotia
Preceded by George Forbes	Baronet (of Castle Forbes); 1765–1769	Succeeded by George Forbes
