= William Forbes, 7th Lord Forbes =

Scottish landowner

William Forbes
- Lord Forbes
- Coat of arms
- Tenure: 1547–1593
- Predecessor: John Forbes, 6th Lord Forbes
- Successor: John Forbes, 8th Lord Forbes
- Born: 1513
- Died: 1593 (aged 79–80)
- Spouse: Elizabeth Keith (m. 1538)
- Issue: John Forbes, 8th Lord Forbes; Robert Forbes of Monymusk; James Forbes of Fechell; Anne Forbes; Jean Forbes; Christian Forbes
- Father: John Forbes, 6th Lord Forbes
- Mother: Christian Lundie

William Forbes, 7th Lord Forbes (1513-1593) was a Scottish landowner.

William was the son of John, 6th Lord Forbes and Christian Lundie.

His eldest son John, Master of Forbes, and his half-brother "Black" Arthur Forbes signed a band on 27 April 1560 at Edinburgh with other Scottish nobles committing themselves to Protestant reformation, and to join with the English army sent to expel French troops from Scotland.

In July 1568 Forbes was at Largs with the Earl of Argyll and with others signed a letter to the Duke of Alva complaining of the treatment of Mary, Queen of Scots in England, and asking him to write to Philip II of Spain to petition Elizabeth I of England and to send troops into Scotland against their enemies.

Despite this, William was reckoned by English diplomats to be a friend to England. He took sides against the supporters Mary, Queen of Scots in the Marian Civil War. The Earl of Huntly sent troops against him in October 1571, and the king's side sent 200 men to aid him. "Black" Arthur Forbes, the earl's brother, was killed at the Battle of Tillieangus. They fought again in Aberdeen at the Battle of Craibstone and John, Master of Forbes, was captured and taken to Huntly Castle. The English ambassador Henry Carey was inclined to view this as a "private quarrel" or feud between the Forbes and Gordons.

In 1590 John, Master of Forbes, was accused of imprisoning his father in a chamber at Druminnor Castle and hitting him on the head with the pommel of his sword. Two younger sons, Robert Forbes Commendator of Monymusk and James Forbes of Fechell brought their father's complaint to the Privy Council, but the Master of Forbes denied it. The Council declared that Drumminor should be kept by William Forbes of Tolquhoun and others till Lord Forbes came to Edinburgh or sent further testimony. In May 1591 the Master of Forbes claimed his brothers had turned his father against him, and while Lord Forbes was lying sick at Dundee they had entered and robbed the House of Druminnor. The younger Forbes brothers obtained royal letters against the Master of Forbes to support their occupation of Druminnor.

In November 1591 Lord Forbes made an alliance with George Keith, 5th Earl Marischal, Francis Hay, 9th Earl of Erroll, and others against the Earl of Huntly. In 1592 Forbes and Huntly promoted rival candidates as Provost of Aberdeen.

== Family ==
William married Elizabeth Keith, heiress of Inverugie. Their children included:

- John Forbes, Master of Forbes, and later 8th Lord Forbes (1542-1606), who married; (1) Margaret Gordon, daughter of George Gordon, 4th Earl of Huntly and Elizabeth Keith. She was the mother of John, Master of Forbes, later 9th Lord Forbes; and (2) Janet Seton, daughter of Walter Seton of Touch, mother of Arthur, 10th Lord Forbes.
- Robert Forbes of Monymusk.
- James Forbes of Fechell.
- Anne Forbes, who married in 1588, Sir John Seton of Barns.
- Jean Forbes, who married James Ogilvy, Lord Airlie.
- Christian Forbes, who married George Johnston of Caskieben, and was the mother of the poet Arthur Johnston.

In July 1592 John, Master of Forbes, wanted his son to marry a sister of the Earl of Gowrie, which the Earl of Huntly opposed, as it would weaken him politically.

Arthur, Master of Forbes, married Jean Elphinstone, in Edinburgh on 5 February 1600. This was double wedding of sisters, daughters of the Master of Elphinstone celebrated at the Mint in the Cowgate, the other couple being, Anna Elphinstone and the Earl of Sutherland, James VI gave both brides a gold chain and fore and back gold garnishing for their hair.

Peerage of Scotland
Preceded by John Forbes	Lord Forbes; 1547–1593	Succeeded by John Forbes
