= Towie Castle =

Coordinates: 57.2037°N 2.9282°W

Towie Castle was a 17th-century tower house, about 3.5 miles (5.6 km) southwest of Kildrummy in Aberdeenshire, Scotland, on the right bank of the Don. It was sometimes known as Towie Forbes to distinguish it from Towie Barclay near Turriff.

== History ==
The property belonged to Clan Forbes. There may have been an earlier castle.

Towie Castle may have been the castle burnt by Adam Gordon of Auchindoun, resulting in the deaths of Lady Forbes, her children, and numerous others, and giving rise to the ballad Edom o Gordon, although this is often related to Corgarff Castle.

The castle was built after 1618, and is thought to have been unfinished. It is said that the tunnels and battlements were said removed in 1788, and the building altered. Ruins of the castle were removed in 1968, with the last remains being removed by Grampian Regional Council in the 1980s.

== Structure ==
Towie Castle was an L-plan tower house, three storeys high; there were corbelled-out bartizans Towie Castle was originally an oblong main building; the western end cellar and a tower projecting from the east end of the south front alone survived to at least 1942. The masonry of the tower is regarded as typical of the 16th or 17th century.

== See also ==
- Castles in Great Britain and Ireland
- List of castles in Scotland
