= John Forbes =

John Forbes may refer to:

== Science ==
- John Forbes (botanist) (1799–1823), English botanist
- John Forbes (physician) (1787–1861), Scottish physician
- John Ripley Forbes (1913–2006), American naturalist and conservationist

== Military ==
- John Forbes (British Army officer) (1707–1759), British general in the French and Indian War
- John Forbes (Portuguese general) (1733–1808), Scottish general in the Portuguese service
- John Forbes (Royal Navy officer) (1714–1796), British admiral and politician
- John Morrison Forbes (1925–2021), British admiral

== Religion ==
- John Forbes (friar) (1571–1606), Scottish Capuchin friar
- John Forbes (Gaelic scholar) (1818–1863), Scottish minister and Gaelic translator
- John Forbes (Alford minister) (c. 1568–1634), Scottish minister exiled by James VI and I
- John Forbes (theologian, born 1593) (1593–1648), Scottish theologian; one of the six "Aberdeen doctors"
- John Forbes (minister of St Paul's, Glasgow) (1800-25 December 1874) Scottish mathematician and minister

== Politics and law ==
- John Forbes, 4th of Culloden (c. 1673–1734), Scottish member of the British Parliament for Inverness-shire, 1715–1722
- John Forbes (1801–1840), British Member of Parliament and East India Company director
- John Forbes (Iowa politician) (born 1956), Iowa State Representative
- John Hay Forbes, Lord Medwyn (1776–1854), Scottish judge
- John Murray Forbes (diplomat) (1771–1831), American diplomat
- John W. Forbes II, American government official in Virginia

== Sports ==
- John Forbes (cricketer) (1931–2017), South African cricketer
- John Forbes (footballer) (1862–1928), Scottish footballer
- John Forbes (sailor) (born 1970), Australian Olympian sailor
- John Forbes (rugby union), Scottish international rugby union player

== Business ==
- John Forbes and Company, the British firm of John Forbes (1767–1823) and his brother Thomas (†1808), a trading company active in the southeastern United States and India, from 1804 to 1847
- John Murray Forbes (1813–1898), American banker and railroad president
- John Malcolm Forbes (1847–1904), American businessman, yachtsman and horseman

== Other people ==
- John Forbes (architect) (1795?–?), British architect
- John Forbes (poet) (1950–1998), Australian poet
- John Forbes, 6th Lord Forbes (died 1547), Scottish landowner
- John Forbes, 8th Lord Forbes (1542–1606), Scottish aristocrat
- John J. Forbes, American mining engineer
- John Stuart Hepburn Forbes, Scottish baronet, landowner, advocate and agriculturalist
