= Marian civil war =

Civil war in Scotland (1568–1573)

Marian Civil War
- Part of the European wars of religion
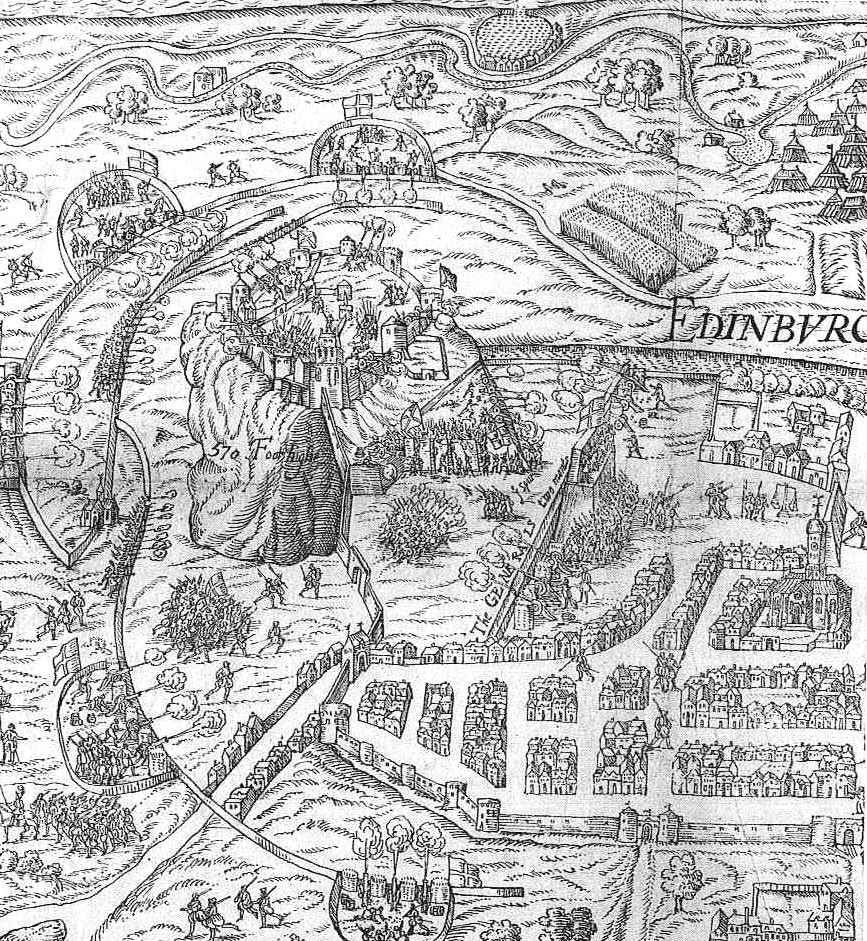
- Woodcut of the Siege of Edinburgh Castle held for Mary in 1573, from Holinshed's Chronicles (1577)
Date	May 1568 – 28 May 1573
Location	Kingdom of Scotland
Result	King's Men victory

Belligerents
(Scotland) King's Men supported by: England	(Scotland) Queen's Men

Commanders and leaders
(Scotland) Regent Moray (Scotland) Regent Lennox (Scotland) Regent Mar (Scotland) Regent Morton (England) William Drury	(Scotland) Duke of Châtellerault (Scotland) Earl of Huntly (Scotland) Lord Fleming (Scotland) Kirkcaldy of Grange (Scotland) Gordon of Auchindoun

The Marian civil war in Scotland (1568–1573) was a period of conflict which followed the abdication of Mary, Queen of Scots, and her escape from Lochleven Castle in May 1568. Those who ruled in the name of her infant son James VI fought against the supporters of the Queen, who was exiled in England. Edinburgh Castle, which was garrisoned in her name, became the focus of the conflict and surrendered only after an English intervention in May 1573. The conflict in 1570 was called an "internecine war in the bowels of this commonwealth", and the period was called soon after an "internecine war driven by questions against authority."

== Queen's men and King's men ==
The supporters of Queen Mary had popular international support for what was seen as the legitimate cause of supporters of an unjustly deposed monarch. The King's party claimed that their cause was a war of religion, like that in France, and that they were fighting for the Protestant cause. Mary had escaped from her imprisonment in Lochleven Castle to join her main supporters in the west of Scotland, but they were defeated at the Battle of Langside by her half-brother James Stewart, 1st Earl of Moray. Mary fled to England and was imprisoned there by Queen Elizabeth I.

The Earl of Moray was Regent of Scotland and ruled with a council of regency. Mary had depended on the support of the Hamilton family at Langside, and existing rivalries with Hamiltons partly determined who came to join her side. Other supporters of the Queen objected to Moray as a ruler.

== Regent Moray marches west and north ==
Moray moved against the supporters of Queen Mary in their south-west power base with a military expedition in June 1568 called the 'Raid of Dumfries' or 'Raid of Hoddom.' The Regent's army with the royal artillery marched to Biggar, where his allies were commanded to muster on 10 June, and on to Dumfries. Biggar was the home area of Lord Fleming who had declared on behalf of Mary. The King's army was protected by a scouting party led by Alexander Hume of Manderston, the vanguard was commanded by the Earl of Morton and Lord Hume. Behind was the "carriage", namely the artillery train, followed by Moray himself. The Laird of Cessford followed, and the army was flanked by the scouting parties of the lairds of the Merse and Buccleuch.

Along the way Moray captured castles belonging to Mary's supporters, including Lord Fleming's castle of Boghall, as well as Skirling Castle, Crawford Castle, Sanquhar Castle, Kenmure Castle, and Hoddom Castle, where the cannon were deployed, and Annan where he rendezvoused with Lord Scrope, the Captain of Carlisle Castle, to discuss border matters. Scrope estimated the Regent's army at 6,000 men. He then returned to Carlisle where he saw Queen Mary's servants play football on 14 June. Moray then took Lochmaben Castle, which the Laird of Drumlanrig was left to hold, and then captured Lochwood and Lochhouse before returning to Edinburgh via Peebles. At Dumfries, a number of Lord Maxwell's supporters surrendered. Moray was responsible for the destruction of Rutherglen castle, which he burned to the ground in 1569 in retribution against the Hamiltons for having supported Mary at Langside.

In June 1569 Moray went north to Brechin where he accepted hostages sent by the Earl of Huntly, then on to Aberdeen where he held talks with Huntly himself. At Inverness, on 4 June 1569, Moray met the Highland and island chiefs along with the Earls of Caithness and Sutherland and Lord Lovat. His secretary, John Wood, said that "such a power had seldom been seen there"; Moray wrote that "the journey is to put down troubles in the north."

Regent Moray was assassinated at Linlithgow on 23 January 1570 by James Hamilton of Bothwellhaugh. Wood was killed while travelling in Fife in April 1570. For a time tensions were increased and the position of the Queen's party improved. Robert Lindsay of Pitscottie wrote of this period of conflict "there was nothing but all this realm was divided and rode all in jacks and spears, for the most part of the realm took the queen's part and a few number the kings".

== Queen's men at Dumbarton ==
The supporters of the exiled Queen were in possession of Dumbarton Castle, a fortress and port that commanded the Clyde. The castle was held for Mary by Lord Fleming, helped by other "Queen's men" including his relation, the Captain of Biggar, and Lord Sempill, who stocked the castle with provisions from the surrounding countryside. It was rumoured that armed support for Mary would land there; in December 1569, William Drury, Marshall of Berwick, heard that the Spanish Duke of Alva was sending troops there from Flanders. The Regent Moray declared that he would explore all means to take the Castle and would have taken it in May 1569, if he had then the opportunity to take his army west;

"Towards Dumbarton, I leif na moyen unsocht to obteyn it, and doubt not, befoir May to have had the same, gif I mycht have reparit to the west countrie my selff."

The Spanish troops did not materialise, but the "King's men" did not take Dumbarton Castle until April 1571. George Buchanan, a contemporary historian and polemicist for the King's party gave an account of the fall of Dumbarton. According to his account, a soldier of the garrison deserted after Lord Fleming had had his wife whipped as a thief. The deserter met Robert Douglas, a relation of the Regent Lennox, and John Cunningham of Drumquhassle and discussed with them ways of capturing the castle. The deserter promised to take the castle with a small band of soldiers. The chronicle Historie of King James the Saxt tells this part of the story differently, having Douglas and Drumquhassle setting out to recruit the former member of the garrison whose name was Robesoun.

The Privy Council of the Regent adopted the plan for a small-scale assault, to be led by Thomas Crawford of Jordanhill, and set the date for this as 1 April. Crawford only informed his men of their objective the night before the attack, at Dumbuck Hill, a mile from Dumbarton.

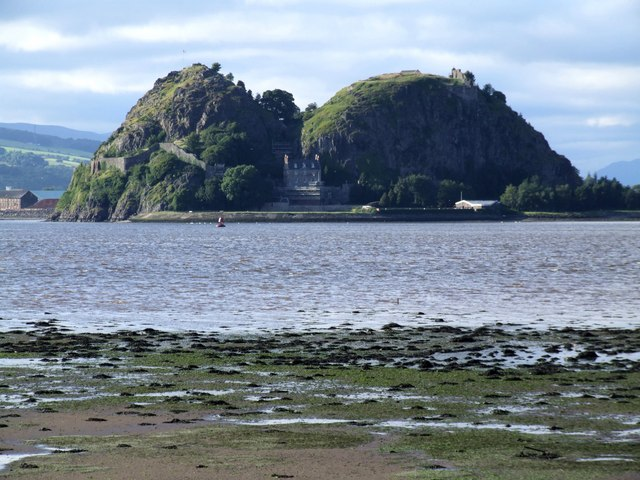
Dumbarton Castle controlling the Clyde was held by Mary's supporters until April 1571

Crawford marched on the castle before daybreak, first encountering the obstacle of a broken bridge and a scare caused by the sight of a will-o'-the-wisp. While they were helped by the mist, their scaling ladders proved unwieldy. When all was going well, one of the soldiers froze on the ladder and had to be tied to it so the others could pass. At the top of the hill Alexander Ramsay was first over the inner wall. Three garrison sentinels spotted him and his two companions and pelted them with rocks, but Alexander killed them. Behind Alexander, the old wall collapsed, allowing the rest of the King's men to enter. According to Buchanan, they shouted "A Darnley, A Darnley," and the garrison scattered. Lord Fleming escaped, but John Fleming, Captain of Boghall (or Biggar), John Hamilton, Archbishop of St Andrews, Verac a French diplomat who had arrived with munitions, Alexander Master of Livingstone, and an Englishman named Johnson were captured. The Regent Lennox came to view the castle. Verac and the Englishmen were released, Fleming of Boghall was imprisoned, and the Archbishop was taken to Stirling and hanged.

In September 1571, cannon from Dumbarton were taken to Edinburgh to use against the Queen's men who had built a barricade across the High Street and were holding Edinburgh Castle on behalf of the deposed Queen.

== War comes to Edinburgh ==
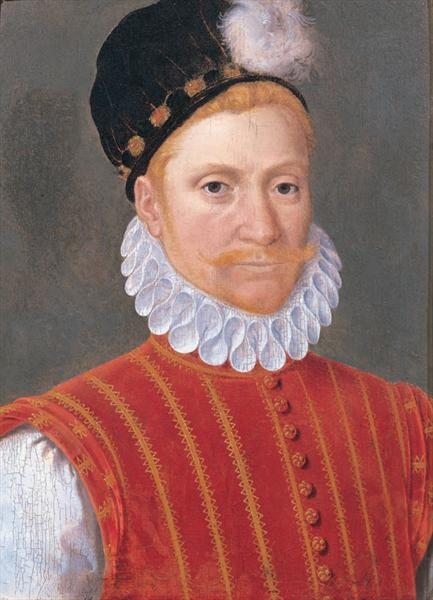
Sir William Kirkcaldy of Grange, painted by Jean Clouet

Edinburgh Castle was initially delivered by its captain, James Balfour, to the Regent Moray, who appointed Sir William Kirkcaldy of Grange as its Keeper. Grange was a trusted lieutenant of the Regent, but after Moray's murder in January 1570 his allegiance to the King's cause wavered. After the capture of Dumbarton Castle by the King's men in April 1571, Grange changed sides, occupying the castle and town for Queen Mary against the new Regent, the Earl of Lennox. There now followed what became known as the "Lang Siege", from the Scots word for "long".

On 2 March 1571, William Kirkcaldy organised a military exercise, with some of his troops pretending to be an English army attacking Edinburgh Castle. Hostilities began at the end of April, after Grange arrested the Provost of Edinburgh, James MacGill of Nether Rankeillour. The period is sometimes called the "War between Leith and Edinburgh" because the Earl of Morton and the King's army based themselves in Leith.

On 22 April two Marian supporters, Arthur Hamilton of Merrynton and Alexander Baillie of Lamington, captured the king's tailor James Inglis near St Cuthbert's Church. He was returning from Stirling Castle, where he had been fitting the king's clothes. Inglis was released two days later after the Deacon of Crafts had spoken with Kirkcaldy. Kirkcaldy now began to strengthen the castle defences and work began on the spur fortification.

The first clash of arms came in May 1571 with a chance encounter at the "Lousie-Law", a hill on the Burgh Muir within sight of Edinburgh Castle. This was followed by a month-long siege of the town of Edinburgh by the King's party, and a short second siege in October. On 13 May, the King's men built a small artillery redoubt for three cannon on the "Dow Craig" of the Calton Hill above Trinity College Kirk, which was attacked the same night. The King's party gathered in the Canongate in a meeting known as the "creeping parliament", from their attempts to assemble inconspicuously, on 14–16 May, while Mary's supporters met in the tolbooth. The blockade of the castle and skirmishing continued. On 2 June 1571 soldiers from the Edinburgh castle were in the grounds of Craigmillar Castle. Captain Melville was fatally injured when a barrel of gunpowder exploded.

There was a struggle at the Gallow Hill of Leith (modern Shrubhill) on 10 June 1571. A parliament convened by the castle party began in the Tolbooth on 12 June. A letter from Queen Mary was produced (some said it was really devised by her allies in the castle) which declared she had been "compelled to demise her authority for fear of her life" as a prisoner at Lochleven. After a vote, The Parliament declared the coronation of James VI "null and of none avail".

On 26 June, known subsequently as "Black Saturday", the Earl of Morton brought his soldiers to Hawkhill at Restalrig, which provoked Grange to bring his men out to the Quarry Holes (where present-day Easter Road meets Abbey Mount). Morton's men pursued them back to the Water Gate at the eastern end of the Canongate. In July, the King's men garrisoned the Palace of Holyroodhouse and Grange responded on 25 July by placing guns in an entrenchment at the "Black Friar Yard" (the modern High School Yards) to shoot at the palace.

Attempts were made to supply Grange and the Castle from France and George, Lord Seton, negotiated for support with Duke of Alba in the Spanish Netherlands. In July 1571, John Chisholm, controller of the royal artillery, was captured after setting out from Dieppe with money from the exiled Bishop of Glasgow, cannonballs of four different calibres, and pikes. He was arrested by Patrick, Lord Lindsay, but managed to pass some of the money to Grange. Although Chisholm was taken at North Queensferry it was thought he had intended to capture Tantallon Castle, linking up with Mary's supporters who unsuccessfully attacked the castle on 2 July 1571.

At this time, Grange began to the demolish houses at the top of the Canongate close to the Netherbow Port (town gate), to create an open killing ground. According to the Diurnal of Occurrents, the Earl of Morton sent soldiers to destroy Grange's Hallyard Castle at Auchtertool in Fife and burn his crops in February 1572. Grange's men, now being called the "Castilians" demolished more houses from February 1572 onwards. The timber from the houses was used as fuel that was needed because the King's forces had sabotaged the coal mines, but the demolitions continued into the summer. The Castilians seem to have been trying to extort loans from the wealthy burgesses who had resorted to Leith, and as many as 50 houses were dismantled by the "Captain of the Chimneys". Grange was more successful in raising money from loans on the security of the crown jewels, which were "laid in wed and pledge" with wealthy merchants and aristocratic allies. Subsequently, an inquest found that two merchants who loaned large sums to the Queen's party had been personal friends of Moray and John Knox.

=== Civil war in the north ===
Meanwhile, in the north of Scotland, Adam Gordon of Auchindoun, brother of the Earl of Huntly, fought for the Queen. Regent Mar encouraged the Clan Forbes who had long feuded with the Gordons in Aberdeenshire to fight for him. Gordon's force was attacked by the Forbes, commanded by Black Arthur Forbes, at the battle of Tillieangus on 10 October 1571, and the Forbes were defeated. Mar sent an army commanded by Captains Chisholm and Wedderburn northwards, and the Earl of Huntly sent a force north from Edinburgh with orders to "offend the Forbeses all they can." The Forbes were again defeated when they marched against the Gordons at Aberdeen at the battle of Craibstone on 20 November 1571, and Arthur Forbes was killed. The son of Lord Forbes was imprisoned at Huntly Castle.

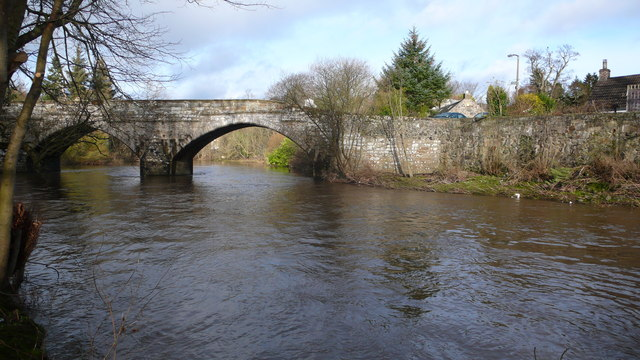
Soldiers sent to support Adam Gordon were captured at Cramond Bridge in 1572 and executed

One of Adam Gordon's men, Captain Thomas Ker, was sent to demand the surrender of Corgarff Castle. Adam ordered the castle to be burnt with its occupants, thirty-eight members of the family including Margaret Forbes, Lady Towie. This incident is recalled in "The ballad of Edom o’Gordon." Gordon then marched on Montrose and forced the town to submit to him and give him £2000 and two tuns of wine. Also at this time Broughty Castle was captured by a Queen's man, the Laird of Parbroath, apparently by a trick or "slight." Broughty was delivered back to the Regent in April 1572.

On 24 April 1572, another attempt was made to send soldiers north from Edinburgh to fight for Adam Gordon in the Queen's cause. The men were to have embarked from Blackness Castle but were forced to surrender at Cramond Bridge to a much larger force of horse and foot commanded by the Earl of Morton. Fifteen of the prisoners "denudit of their weapons" were executed, and the remaining five men were taken to Leith and hanged. According to the anti-Morton chronicle Historie of James the Sext, this "forme of law" was called the "Dowglas Warres." Adam Gordon was besieging the House of Glenbervie in the Mearns in July 1572, when he encountered and defeated the King's army at Brechin.

=== Last year of the Lang Siege ===
Archibald Douglas received money from Flanders for the garrison of Edinburgh Castle. He was captured in April 1572, with a number of letters in cipher code, which the king's party deciphered. Douglas was a double agent and the cipher letters were obtained as a ruse devised with William Drury.

Niddry Castle, about 11 miles west of Edinburgh, was held for the Queen by Lord Seton. According to the Historie of James the Sext, when Niddry was attacked, in April and June 1572, the garrison of Edinburgh Castle supported Niddry by carrying out a diversionary attack on Merchiston Castle which was being held for the King.

The King's party appealed to Elizabeth I of England for assistance, as they lacked the artillery and money required to reduce Edinburgh Castle, and feared that Grange would receive aid from France. Elizabeth sent ambassadors to negotiate, and in July 1572 a truce was agreed and the blockade lifted. The town was effectively surrendered to the King's party, with Grange confined to the castle.

The truce expired on 1 January 1573 and Grange began bombarding the town. His supplies of powder and shot, however, were running low, and despite having 40 cannon available, there were only seven gunners in the garrison. The King's forces, under the new Regent, the Earl of Morton, progressed plans for a siege. Trenches were dug to surround the castle and St Margaret's Well, one of its main sources of water, was poisoned with white arsenic, lime, and rotten meat. The surveyor of Berwick, Rowland Johnson, and the Master Gunner, John Fleming, made plans to place cannon to bombard the castle. Peace talks involving the English diplomat Henry Killigrew and the Queen's party resulted in the "Pacification of Perth" on 15 February 1573, and after the Earl of Huntly had met Morton at Aberdour Castle, all Queen Mary's other supporters in Scotland surrendered to Morton except Grange and the Castilians.

Grange resolved to continue in the Castle, despite water shortages. With him remained William Maitland of Lethington, Mary's former secretary, his brother John Maitland, Alexander Lord Home, Robert Melville of Murdocairnie, Robert Crichton Bishop of Dunkeld, Robert Logan of Restalrig, and the Castle's Governor, Henry Echlin of Pittadro. The garrison continued to bombard the town, killing a number of citizens. They also made sorties to set fires, burning 100 houses in the town, and then firing on anyone attempting to put out the flames. Some townspeople, like Robert Moubray moved to Leith, and set up an alternative Edinburgh burgh council there.

=== The English bombardment ===
On 17 April, Lord Ruthven finalised terms with the English commander William Drury, Marshall of Berwick, at Lamberton Kirk to bring an English army and artillery to take the castle. There was a list of those who should be taken prisoner and handed over by the English to be tried by the laws of Scotland, including the leading Castilians and the negotiator Henry Echlin. By 20 April, a force of around 1,000 English troops, led by William Drury, arrived in Edinburgh. They were followed by 27 cannon from Berwick-upon-Tweed, including one that had been cast within Edinburgh Castle and previously captured by the English at Flodden. Drury's men built a battery on the Castle Hill, facing its eastern defences, and five other batteries to the north, west, and south. Some of the trenches were made by a Scottish workforce directed by their overseer John Scarlat. Scarlat, a stone mason, was killed while working in the trenches, and Regent Morton gave his widow Marion Ellane an income to support her four children.

The cannon emplacements were fortified with gabions, baskets of stone made from "rysse" (willow twigs and brushwood) brought from Haddingtonshire and West Lothian to Greyfriar's Port. Three Scottish cannon were brought from Stirling Castle by boat on the Forth, supervised by Michael Gardiner, and a small "yetling" gun from Tantallon Castle, and Edinburgh castle's well (outside near Princes's Street Gardens) was poisoned. Morton gave the workers who made gabions a bonus drinksilver payment after the castle surrendered.

Grange's sister became ill, and he requested that she be allowed to leave the castle. Morton refused. By 17 May 1573 the batteries were ready, and the bombardment began, lasting 12 days with the guns expending around 3,000 shots. The castle guns returned fire with "hot shooting". Grange's allies sent coded letters into the castle attached to arrows. Drury's men found a letter and were able to decipher it. The letter described the strength of the English force, and suggested a counter-attack. On 21 May Drury had to encourage his terrified gunners by firing the cannons himself. David's Tower fell on 23 May.

=== The castle surrenders ===
On 26 May, the English attacked and captured the Spur, the outer fortification of the castle. The following day, Grange emerged from the castle, having called a ceasefire to allow a surrender to be negotiated. When it was made clear that he would not be allowed to go free even after a surrender, Grange resolved to continue the resistance, but the garrison threatened to mutiny. Grange negotiated for Drury and his men to come into the castle on 28 May, surrendering to the English rather than to Regent Morton. The Privy Council made a proclamation that none should trouble the "gentlewomen and other women" who were in the castle, or those offering them hospitality.

Drury paid Scottish labourers a bawbee for each cannon-ball dug out of the rubble of the castle. The crown jewels or Honours of Scotland were found in a chest in a "cave" or cellar. The keeping of Edinburgh Castle was handed over to George Douglas of Parkhead, the Regent's brother, and most of the garrison were allowed to go free. The defeated Marian leaders were held briefly in Robert Gourlay's house, and then taken to Dury's lodging in Leith. After a week he handed them to Regent Morton. William Kirkcaldy of Grange, his brother James, with the two jewellers James Mosman and James Cockie who had been minting coins in Mary's name inside the castle, were hanged at the Cross in Edinburgh on 3 August.

=== Mary's jewels and lenders to her cause ===
Ten years after these events, the English diplomat Thomas Randolph wrote to Francis Walsingham to certify that Drury had found Mr Archibald Douglas a "fit instrument" to secretly negotiate with Grange, William Maitland of Lethington, Robert Melville, and others, especially to persuade them to surrender Edinburgh Castle. Randolph noted that Drury and Archibald were involved in the sale of Mary's jewels for cash and loans raised against them to support the garrison. The goldsmiths James Mosman and James Cockie valued the jewels and managed the loans.

The goldsmiths' receipts and Grange's accounts regarding Mary's jewels survived the siege. Those who lent money on the security of pledges of jewels as allies of Mary, Queen of Scots, and kinsmen and supporters of Grange included; Alexander Clark of Balbirnie, Mungo Fairlie, James Hamilton, Duke of Châtellerault, Helen Leslie, Lady Newbattle, Agnes Gray, Lady Home, Thomas Kerr of Ferniehirst, Clement Littill, William Maitland of Lethington, Henry Ramsay of Colluthie, Robert Scot, and William Sinclair of Roslin. At the end of the siege, Drury took the chest of remaining jewels from the castle to Leith, and most of Mary's jewels were returned to him and Mr Archibald Douglas there. Regent Morton subsequently recovered more of the jewels that were held as pledges.

== England's involvement ==
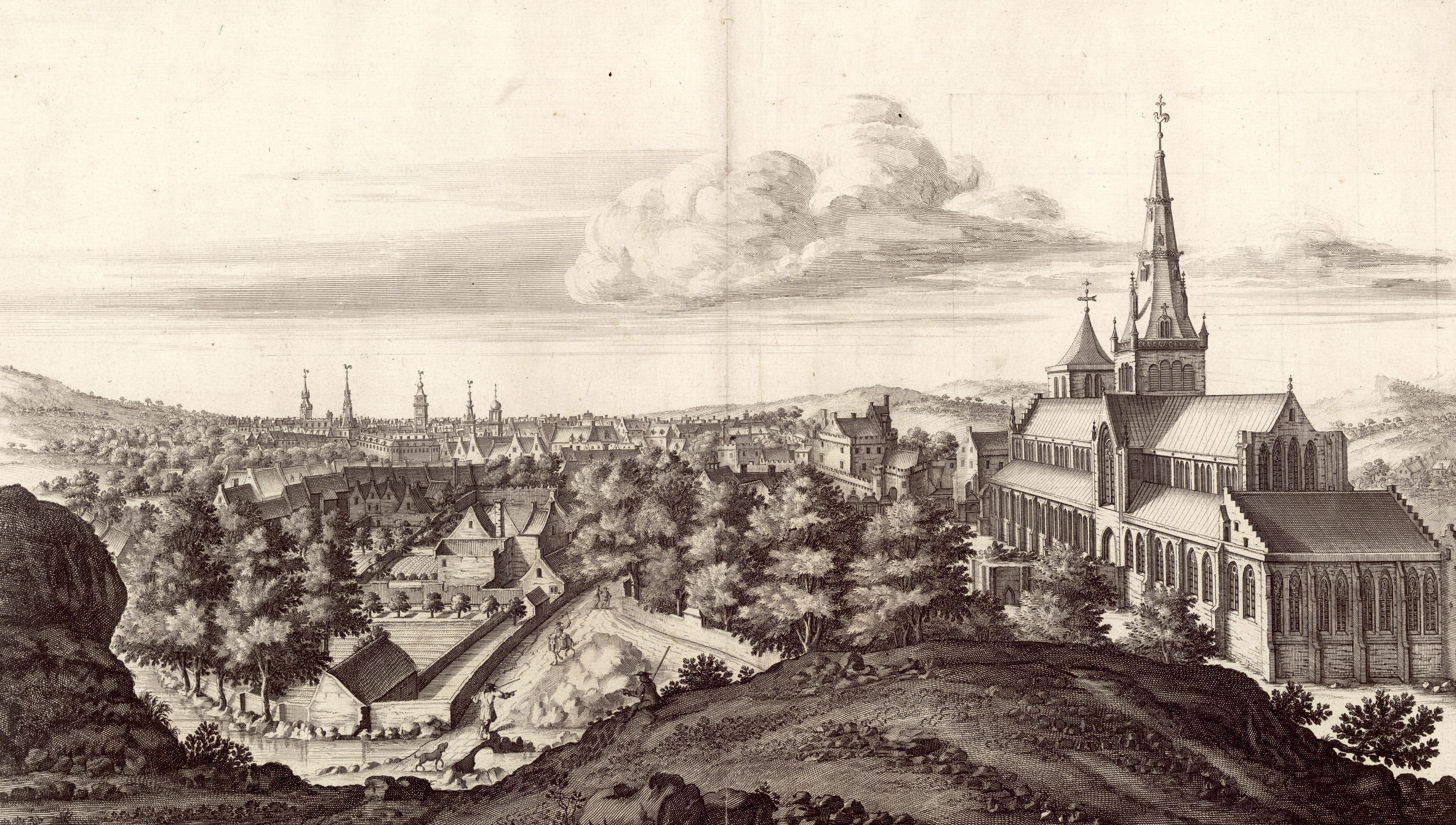
Glasgow Cathedral, and the Castle captured by the King's party in April 1571, by John Slezer, (1693)

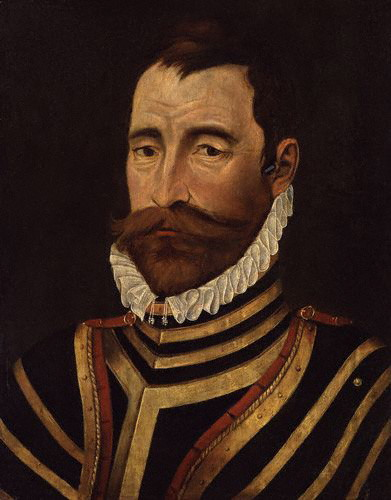
Sir William Drury commanded two English missions in Scotland, by an unknown artist

In 1568, Regent Moray and his secretary John Wood tried to gain English support by producing the Casket letters in England, which were intended to incriminate Mary in the death of Lord Darnley. Moray also raised money in London by selling items from the royal jewels, including what was claimed to be a unicorn horn. Queen Elizabeth and her advisors were at first reluctant to intervene but their actions, and support of Moray, served to prevent reconciliation in Scotland.

Regent Moray was assassinated in January 1570 by a member of the Hamilton family. Elizabeth sent an army into Scotland in May 1570, which reached Glasgow, where the Queen's party were besieging Glasgow Castle. The army was commanded by the Earl of Sussex, its leader in Scotland was William Drury, styled "Captain General." The Earl of Lennox was in their company, arriving at Edinburgh on 14 May 1570. The Marian lords abandoned their siege of Glasgow Castle before the English arrived on 18 May, and returned to their homelands, the Hamiltons to Arran and Craignethan Castle, and Drury attempted a siege of Dumbarton Castle. For Elizabeth's foreign policy this intervention had the effect of making France and Spain less likely to offer tangible pro-Marian support in Scotland.

After the Rising of the North and the discovery of the Ridolfi plot which further damaged Mary's reputation, Regent Mar and James Douglas, Earl of Morton were able to broker the deployment of an English army against Mary's supporters at Edinburgh Castle. The English diplomat Henry Killigrew worked on the reconciliation of the Scottish nobility at Perth in February 1572, where many promised not to support Mary as Queen. The fall of Edinburgh Castle concluded the civil war.

== Diplomacy, propaganda, and the elective theory of Scottish monarchy ==
Mary's secretary, John Lesley, Bishop of Ross maintained a daily correspondence to canvass for her release and enlist support for her cause. George Seton, 7th Lord Seton made unsuccessful attempts to acquire Spanish soldiers to fight in Scotland. Seton was given a commission by the Duke of Châtellerault, the Earl of Huntly and the Earl of Argyll to treat with the Duke of Alba, Viceroy of Lower Germany, as Mary's ambassador in August 1570. Seton became involved with Elizabeth's exiles. In September 1570, Lord Morley met him in the household of Katherine Neville, Countess of the exiled Earl of Northumberland at Bruges. Seton told Morley that he had come to escort the Countess, who had previously sought refuge in Scotland, to France. The Historie and Life of James the Sext recorded what must have been a popular account of the mission to the Duke of Alba. Seton tried to convince him to provide an army of 10,000 men by persuading Scottish soldiers fighting against Spain in the Netherlands to change sides. However, Alba could not spare the men, and Seton only received a promise of financial support. Still trying to subvert the Scottish soldiers, he was captured and tortured on the rack. The Scottish soldiers then mutinied until he was released.

The King's party also wrote a number of letters and took initiatives to increase their following and secure aid from England. Amidst the opportunities for disinformation, when uncertain news of the capture of Dumbarton reached London in April 1571, the English diplomat Thomas Randolph reported John Lesley pretending that Dunbar Castle had fallen, a fortress-port on the opposite coast of Scotland which had little significance in the war since Moray's parliament had ordered it to be demolished in December 1567. The Earl of Shrewsbury wrote that Mary herself seemed to discount the loss of Dumbarton in her conversation, but had suffered a loss of appetite after hearing the news.

In Scotland, news and opinion was circulated in the form of printed ballads which satirised the characters and actions of the leaders of the opposing parties. Lord Fleming's defence of Dumbarton for Mary was satirized in a ballad The tressoun of Dumbertane, printed in Edinburgh by Robert Lekprevik in May 1570. The verses, attributed to Robert Sempill, describe Fleming's failed ambush of the English commander William Drury. Another ballad, an Answeir to the Englisch Ballad, criticised Regent Mar, the Earl of Morton and colleagues for the rendition of the Earl of Northumberland to England after the Rising of the North;

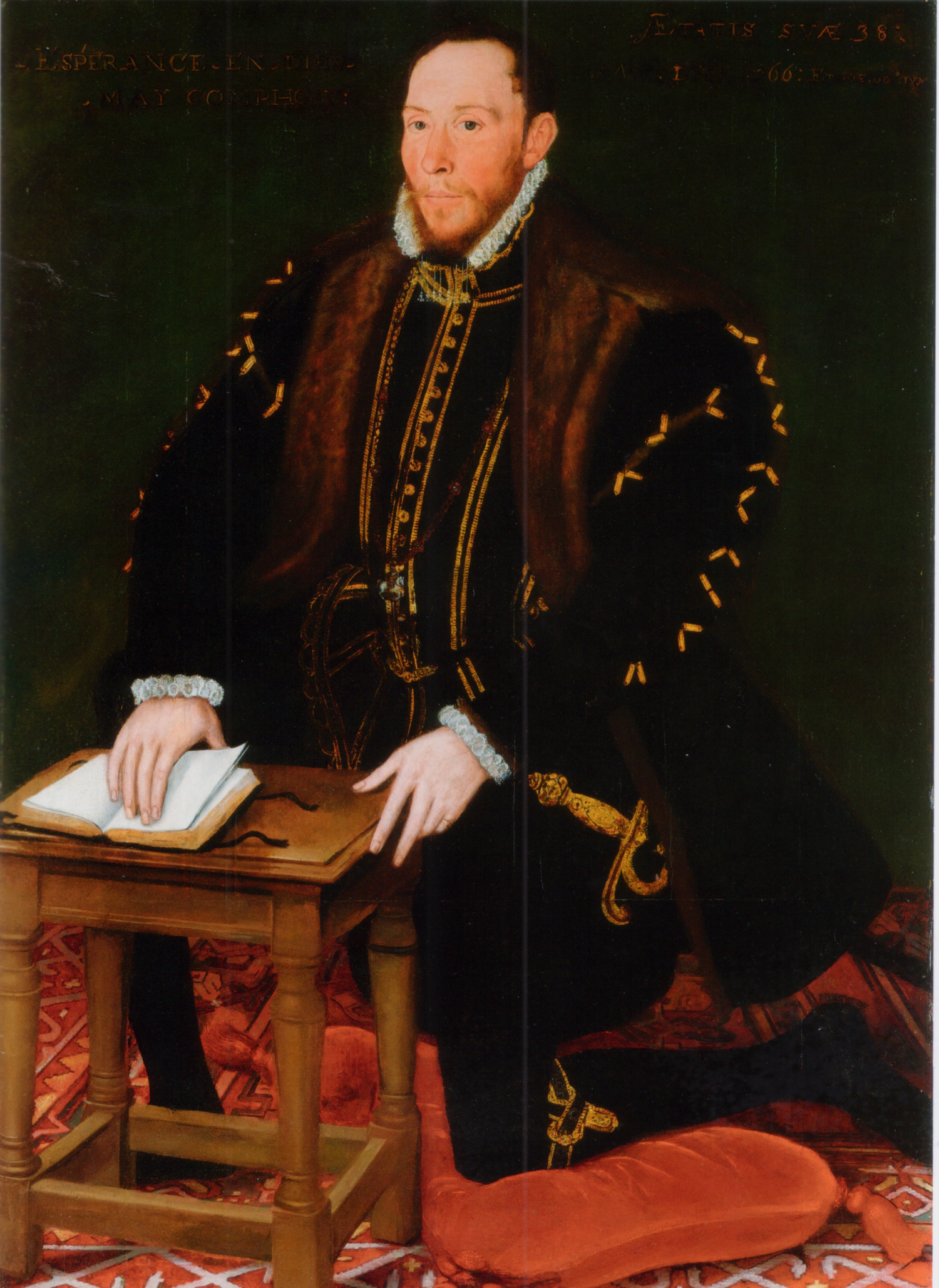
Thomas Percy, 7th Earl of Northumberland was returned to England for execution

Thocht sum have playit Judas' pairt,
In selling gud Northumberland,
Quhy sould the whoill, for thair desert,
That faine wald have that fact withstand?
Or yit the countrey beir the blame?
Let thame that sauld him have the schame.

Mar, and the divelishe Douglassis,
And namelie, Morton and Lochlevin, (Robert Douglas of Lochleven)
Mackgill and Orknay, Scottisch assis, (Adam Bothwell, Bishop of Orkney))
And Cleisch quhom to the gold wes gevin, (Robert Colville of Cleish)
Dunfermling that the py prepaird, (Robert Pitcairn, Commendator of Dunfermline: "pie prepared" plotted)
And lowse Lindsay quho was his gaird,
These onlie wer the Judassis.

The ballad accurately identified Robert Colville of Cleish as the principle broker for delivering Northumberland to Berwick and his subsequent execution.

After the Ridolphi plot was made public in 1571, George Buchanan's short anti-Marian narrative, describing the murder of Lord Darnley, the Detectio, Ane Detectioun, and Detection of Mary Stewart were published in London and St Andrews in Latin and Scots. The Detection included some of the text of the casket letters. Later histories retained the bias of the antagonists. In France in these years, despite much sympathy for Mary in Catholic court and Guisian circles, there were no publications in her support, probably because it was foreseen they would damage diplomatic relations with England. The first printed work to champion her cause was the anonymous L'Innocence de Marie Roine d'Ecosse (Reims, 1573). This was a response to the publication in London of a French version of George Buchanan's arguments against Mary, the Histoire de Marie Royne d'Ecosse & l'Aduterie commis avec le Comte de Bothwell, and L'Innocence sought to discredit the late Regent Moray's actions and his faction in Scotland. L'Innocence, however only ran to two editions. A French Protestant, Huguenot, response came later with Le Reveille-Matin, attributed to Nicolas Barnaud and printed in Latin, Dutch and German and French in 1575. This work situated Mary with her Guise relatives and vilified them and called for her execution.

After the execution of Queen Mary, Adam Blackwood wrote the Martyre de la Royne d'Escosse, Douairiere de France (1587) which painted an unflattering picture of Regent Moray as a scheming fox and of Regent Morton, who he said was cursed by his own father as an infant after eating a toad. Propaganda written by the anonymous "Tom Truth" against Regent Moray, alleged that his mother Margaret Erskine had claimed she was contracted to marry James V. Such claims would make her son the king's heir. The late 16th-century narrative Historie of King James Sext, a major source for the civil war, sometimes attributed to John Colville (first published selectively in 1706 by David Crawford of Drumsoy and in full in 1804) was sympathetic to the Hamiltons and hostile to the Regents.

=== Debate on the nature of Scottish monarchy ===
After the civil had ended, and while Mary remained captive, full-length books were published, not only setting out the context and events of the struggle, but examining the historical and theoretical aspects of monarchical rule in Scotland. George Buchanan wrote De Jure Regni apud Scotos (The Law of Kingship Amongst the Scots) (1579) and, as a sympathiser of the Queen's party, David Chalmers of Ormond published the Histoire Abbregee de tous les Roys de France, Angleterre et Escosse (Paris, 1579). These works, like Buchanan's History of Scotland (1572), retold the stories of ancient Scottish Kings, many mythical who had been deposed justly or unjustly by their subjects, and might be compared with Mary. Both Buchanan and Chambers were patriotic writers and shared a view of Scottish kingship drawn largely from myth, that the Scots had been a migrant people from Scythia who had elected their first king, Fergus I, in response to a crisis, 251 years after their arrival in Scotland. The historian Roger A. Mason describes the central premiss of Buchanan's De Jure Regni, which is at odds with ideas of absolute monarchy;

Buchanan expounded a theory of popular sovereignty whose central premiss was that kings were appointed by the people to perform on their behalf a set of well-defined functions. It followed that if they failed to carry out their duties satisfactorily, thereby breaking the contract entered into by terms of their coronation oath, the people had the right to depose them in favour of someone more able to fulfil the duties of the royal office. Monarchy, in short, was an elective form of government and kings were accountable to those who elected them.

Buchanan wrote that "wicked kings, so often as they intended tyranny over their subjects, were restrained" insisting that in his day a similar custom persisted in the election of Clan Chiefs among the Highlanders or "Old Scots". The same legend had already been used by Mary's adherents to opposite effect. In December 1569, a supporter of Mary, perhaps John Lesley, had argued that the election of Fergus I and the resultant nature of Scottish kingship meant that the Scottish parliament could not have been competent to accept Mary's abdication.

Buchanan's views would later be described as monarchomachic by the Scottish jurist William Barclay. James VI rejected Buchanan's position and attempted to have his works censored. In September 1583, he dismissed advice given by Francis Walsingham in person, saying he was an "absolute King." Contemporary Marian writers, including Adam Blackwood, argued that Buchanan's views reflected more the conditions and institutions of Ancient Rome rather than Scotland at any period, and that the elective aspect of Scotland's monarchy ended with the initial binding oath of allegiance of the Scottish people to Fergus I and his successors.

== Key events ==
- 15 June 1567; Battle of Carberry Hill, leading to Mary's abdication.
- 13 May 1568; Battle of Langside, leading to Mary's exile in England.
- June 1568; "Raid of Dumfries", Regent Moray's campaign in the west against Mary's supporters.
- November 1569; Rising of the North in England, adversely affects Mary's support in England.
- 1569–1573; the siege of Chanonry Castle between the Munro and Mackenzie clans was in part connected with the Marian civil war. The castle had been granted to the Mackenzies by Lesley of Balquhair, cousin of Bishop John Lesley, a loyal supporter of Queen Mary, and to the Munros by the three successive Regents of Scotland (Moray, Lennox, and Mar), the supporters of the king and opponents of Mary. Although Mary lost the war, the castle was passed over to the Mackenzies by an act of pacification.
- 23 January 1570; Assassination of Regent Moray by James Hamilton of Bothwellhaugh.
- 11 May 1570; English army led by William Drury marches on Glasgow.
- 17 May 1570; Relief of siege and of Glasgow Castle, followed by capture of Hamilton Castle, Cadzow Castle, Craignethan Castle, and burning of Kinneil House.
- 25 August 1570; Capture of Doune Castle by Regent Lennox.
- 5 April 1571; Capture of Dumbarton Castle by Regent Lennox from Lord Fleming who held it for Mary.
- May 1571; "Lang Siege" of Edinburgh Castle by the Regent's forces begins.
- 4 September 1571; Regent Lennox fatally wounded by gunshot in a fight with the Queen's party at Stirling, according to some reports, by friendly fire.
- September 1571; Discovery of the Ridolfi plot, resulting in the belief that Mary would not be released.
- 10 October & 20 November 1571; Battle of Tillieangus and Battle of Craibstone, the Forbes for the King, against the Gordons for the Queen.
- February 1573; "Pacification of Perth", February 1573, the reconciliation of some key adversaries.
- April 1573; Arrival of an English army to besiege Edinburgh Castle, led by William Drury.
- 28 May 1573; Surrender of Edinburgh Castle by William Kirkcaldy of Grange.
