= Druminnor Castle =

Castle in Aberdeenshire, Scotland

Coordinates: 57.3256°N 2.8101°W

Druminnor castle
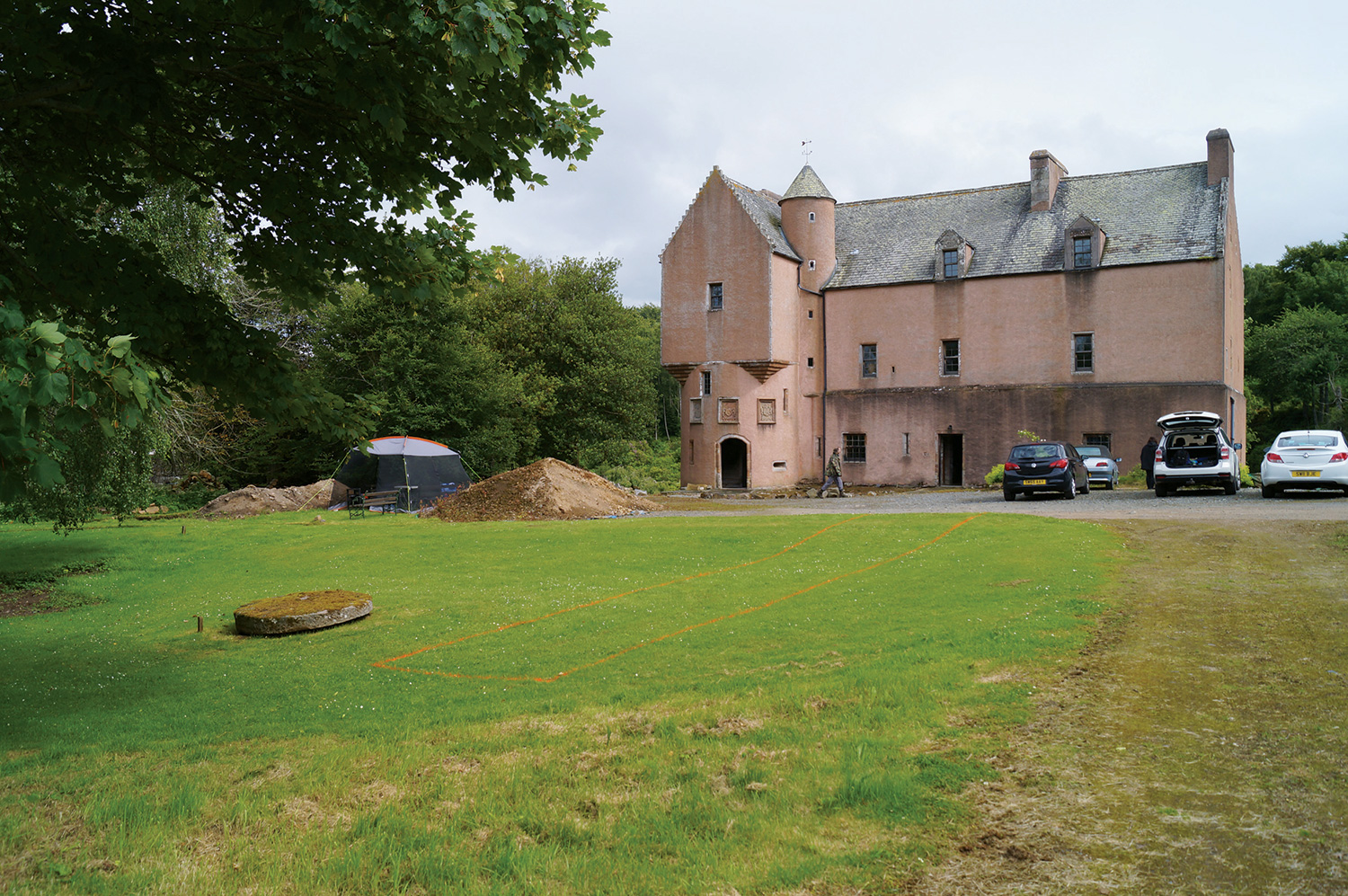

Site history
- Built: 15th century

Druminnor Castle is an L-plan castle, dating from the early 15th century, about two miles east of Rhynie, in a steep valley by the Keron burn, in Aberdeenshire, Scotland.

== History ==
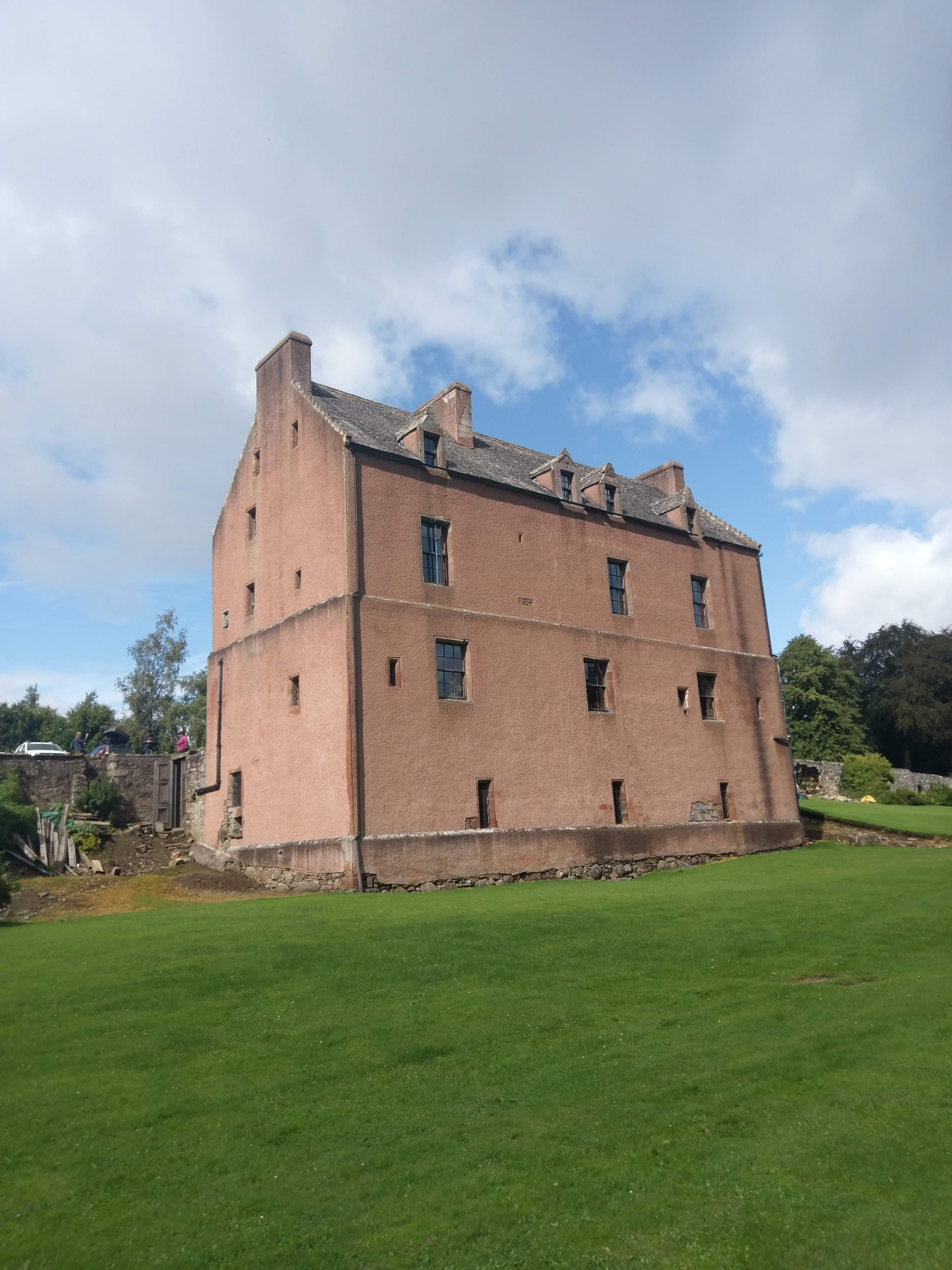
The castle in 2019

In about 1271 Alexander III of Scotland granted land to Duncan Forbes in this area and there may have been a castle up the river from the present site.

A second Druminnor Castle is thought to have been the original Castle Forbes. The original tower house, dated from 1456, was demolished in the early 19th century. It was described as "a square tower united to a half-square and which contains the staircase".

The third castle, originally attached to the second tower, was built in 1440-70.

The Gordon and Forbes families had a protracted feud, in the course of which twenty of the Gordons were murdered in the castle’s Great Hall in 1571. Later that year a party from Clan Forbes was defeated by a party of Gordons at the battle of Tillieangus, Black Arthur Forbes, their commander, being killed by William Gordon of Terpersie, and the survivors being pursued to the gates of Druminnor Castle. This dispute arose after the Master of Forbes repudiated his wife, the daughter of the Earl of Huntly.

In 1590 John, Master of Forbes was accused of imprisoning his father, William, Lord Forbes, in a chamber at Druminnor and hitting him on the head with the pommel of his sword. Two younger sons, Robert Forbes Commendator of Monymusk and James Forbes of Fechell brought their father's complaint to the Privy Council, but John Forbes denied it. The Council declared that Drumminor should be kept by William Forbes of Tolquhoun and others till Lord Forbes came to Edinburgh or sent further testimony. In May 1591 John Master of Forbes claimed that his brothers had turned his father against him, and while Lord Forbes was lying sick at Dundee they had entered and robbed the House of Druminnor. The younger Forbes brothers obtained royal letters against the Master of Forbes to support their occupation of Druminnor.

Additions were made to the castle in 1841-43, under the plans of Archibald Simpson, but these were removed in a further restoration by Margaret Sempill-Forbes in the 20th century, initially with the guidance of Ian Gordon Lindsay.

== Structure ==
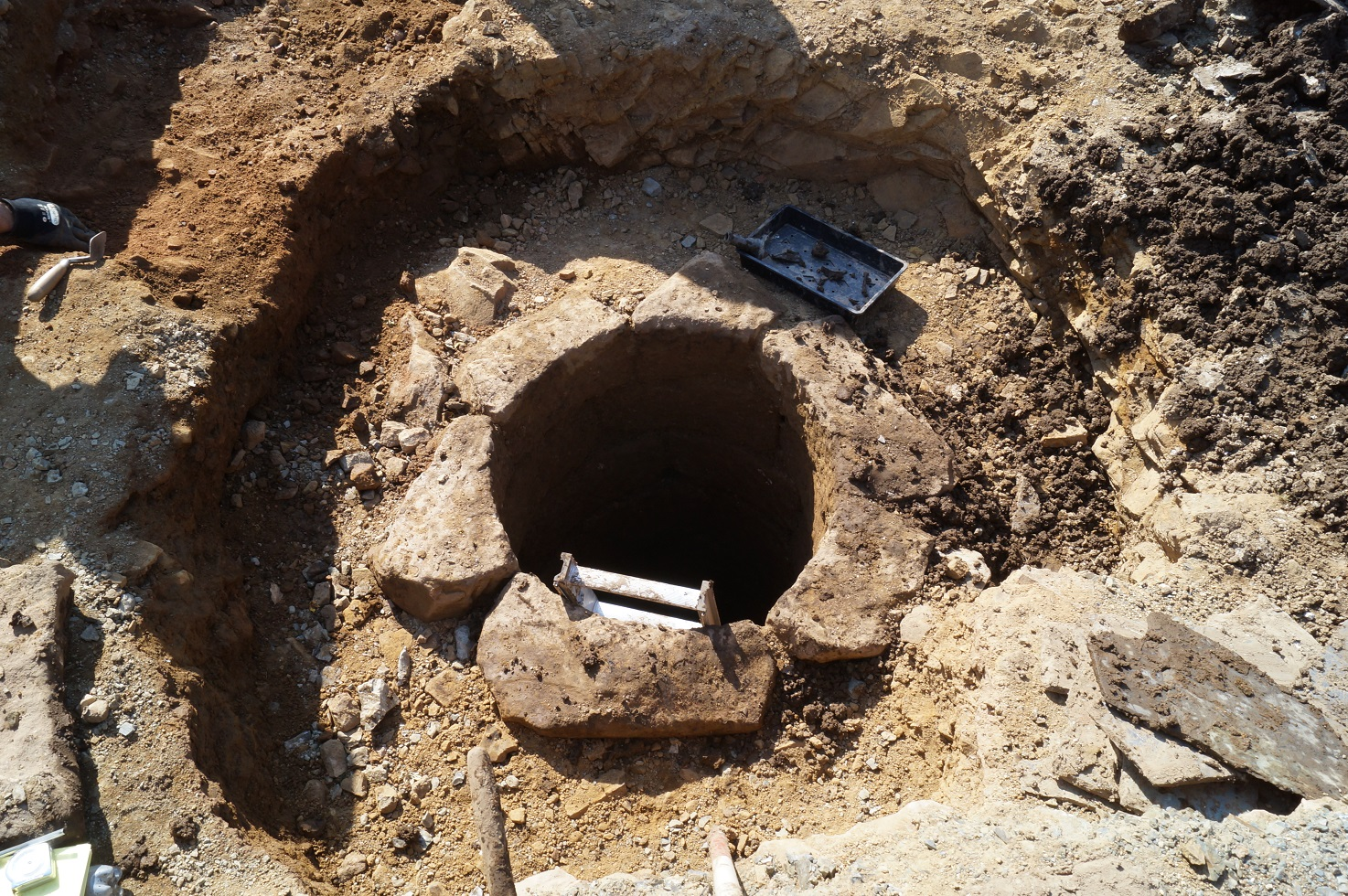
The well during excavation in 2019

The L-plan castle has a modern door central in the north front. The basements are all vaulted. The Great Hall is on the first floor.

The doorway arch, comprising five straight sections, is thought to be unique in Scotland. There is heavy corbelling carrying the circular stair tower, to the North-East, squared out to create the watch room, on the first floor. There are gun loops which are wide-flanking. The walls are intaken at the first floor level.

There are three armorial panels over the door. The south front is four storeys high because of the slope of the ground.

The 1815 wing which has now been demolished had pointed gables and three good dormer heads.

It is a category A listed building.
