= Boquet, Pennsylvania =

Unincorporated community in Pennsylvania, United States

Coordinates: 40°22′53″N 79°36′08″W

Boquet is an unincorporated community in Penn Township, Westmoreland County, Pennsylvania, United States.

Located in southwestern Pennsylvania, it has historic significance as the site of the Battle of Bushy Run during the American Colonial Era. Some historical buildings remain from the early 19th through early 20th centuries.

== Etymology ==
It is commonly accepted that Boquet was named after General Henry Bouquet, a British army officer of the 18th century. His name was sometimes spelled Boquet.

The community lies along the original route of the Forbes Road, the military road created by a British/colonial force under British General John Forbes to displace the French from Fort Duquesne in 1758. (It was the second road into western Pennsylvania, the first having been Braddock's Road in 1755.) Within a few years of its creation, the segment of Forbes Road that Boquet would come to be located upon was removed several miles to the south. The Battle of Bushy Run, part of Pontiac's War, took place at a site on the newer, more southerly route of Forbes' Road.

== History ==
There were some small businesses in the community in the 19th century, including a hickory handle factory.

In the 1880s, Boquet had a post office; however, it lacked a railroad station of its own.

The local telephone company was incorporated in 1905, and had two directors from Boquet.

== Landmarks ==
Possibly the most significant landmark in the Boquet area is the Greensburg Jeannette Regional Airport.

Just over a mile's distance from the community lies the site of the Battle of Bushy Run, an important part of the Pontiac’s War. Re-enactments of the battle are held annually on the first full weekend of August.

Boquet is home to numerous historical buildings from the 19th century, including a former whiskey bonding house and mansion, built of cut stone in 1818, which has since been remodeled into a home.

There are also two historic Christian churches nearby: Denmark Manor United Church of Christ in Export, and St. Barbara Roman Catholic Church in Harrison City.
