= Colquhonnie Castle =

16th-century tower house in Scotland

Coordinates: 57.199°N 3.051°W

Designations

Scheduled monument
- Official name: Colquhonnie Castle
- Type: Secular: castle; tower
- Designated: 3 March 1993
- Reference no.: SM5637

Colquhonnie Castle is a ruined 16th-century tower house, about 10.5 miles (16.9 km) north of Ballater, Aberdeenshire, Scotland, around 1.0 mile (1.6 km) east of Strathdon, north of the River Don, Aberdeenshire. The alternative spelling is Colquhonny. The castle is designated as a scheduled monument.

== History ==
The castle belonged to the Forbeses of Towie. Because three of the lairds were killed when overseeing its construction, it was never finished, according to tradition, but this is disputed. Until 1507 Colquhonnie was a part of the lordship of Strathdon, when it was granted to Alexander Elphinstone, 1st Lord Elphinstone. It later came into the possession of the Forbeses of Towie, and was listed as a gentleman's seat in 1724.

== Structure ==
This L-plan castle was on a moderately steep south-facing slope, at an altitude of 285 metres (935 ft). It measures a maximum of 13.7 metres (45 ft) from east to west by 12 metres (39 ft); the walls were about 1.4 metres (4 ft 7 in) thick. The entrance, in the south wall, opened into a lobby from which access could be gained to the three basement rooms on either side, and to the first floor by stairs that lay straight ahead. The vaulted basement rooms were lit by slit windows, several of which have been subsequently widened. The kitchen occupies the basement room to the north-west, and has a large fireplace on the north and a slop on the west. There is also a narrow cellar while the two other rooms were used for storage. The first-floor hall occupied all of the larger west wing. A vaulted chamber in the smaller east wing has its own fireplace in the east gable, a press on the south, and a small chamber in the thickness of the north wall lit by a slit window. There was apparently a moat, but no trace remains.

The entrance is well protected by a wide-mouthed shot hole and two gun loops. A recess for keys or a lamp is positioned on the east side, within the door.

== See also ==
- Castles in Great Britain and Ireland
- List of castles in Scotland
