= John Forbes, 8th Lord Forbes =

Scottish aristocrat

John Forbes, 8th Lord Forbes (1542–1606) was a Scottish aristocrat.

He was a son of William Forbes, 7th Lord Forbes (1513-1593) and Elizabeth Keith, the heiress of Inverugie.

He was first Master of Forbes, and became Lord Forbes on the death of his father.

In 1590 John Forbes, known as the Master of Forbes, was accused of imprisoning his father in a chamber at Druminnor Castle and hitting him on the head with the pommel of his sword. Two younger brothers, Robert Forbes, Commendator of Monymusk, and James Forbes of Fechell brought their father's complaint to the Privy Council, but the Master of Forbes denied it. The Council declared that Drumminor should be kept by William Forbes of Tolquhoun and others till Lord Forbes came to Edinburgh or sent further testimony. In May 1591 the Master of Forbes claimed his brothers had turned his father against him, and while Lord Forbes was lying sick at Dundee they had entered and robbed the House of Druminnor. The younger Forbes brothers obtained royal letters against the Master of Forbes to support their occupation of Druminnor.

In July 1592 John, Master of Forbes, wanted his son to marry a sister of the Earl of Gowrie, but this connection was opposed by the Earl of Huntly, as it would weaken him politically.

== Marriages and family ==
John Forbes married firstly, Margaret Gordon, daughter of George Gordon, 4th Earl of Huntly and Elizabeth Keith. Their children included:

- William Forbes (1563–1592), who became a Capuchin friar
- John Forbes, Master of Forbes, later 9th Lord Forbes, (1570-1606), also a Capuchin friar under the name Father Archangel. His lordship was disputed and retroactively discounted. (Note: The numbering dispute vacillated over the years and was most recently settled in 1955 (As of 2023).)

He married secondly, in 1580, Janet Seton (1544–1616), daughter of Walter Seton of Touch, and widow of John Bellenden of Auchnoul. Some books from her library survive. Their children included

- Arthur, 9th Lord Forbes (1581–1641) — retrospectively reduced from 10th when his brother's lordship was discounted. In February 1601 he married Jean Elphinstone, a daughter of Lord Elphinstone. The wedding was celebrated over two days in Elphinstone's lodging in the Royal Mint, or "Cunyiehous", in Edinburgh's Cowgate, with James VI and Anne of Denmark as guests. As a wedding gift, James VI gave Jean Elphinstone a suite of gold and pearl accessories comprising a necklace, a belt, and back and fore "garnishings" for her hair. Their sons Alexander Forbes, later Lord Forbes, and John Forbes served in the Swedish army.
- Katherine Forbes, who married William Gordon of Rothiemay (died 1630).

== Notes ==
Peerage of Scotland
Preceded by William Forbes	Lord Forbes; 1593–1606	Succeeded by John or Arthur Forbes
