= Corgarff =

Hamlet in Aberdeenshire, Scotland

Coordinates: 57°9′39″N 3°11′33″W

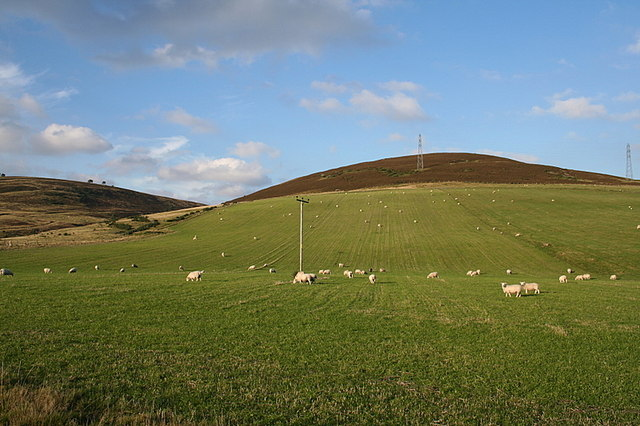
Grazing sheep on the lower reaches of Carn Iain (528m), north of Corgarff

Corgarff (Scottish Gaelic: Corr Garaidh) is a hamlet in Aberdeenshire, Scotland, in the Grampian Mountains. The nearby Corgarff Castle was used as a military barracks in the 18th century. The hamlet's primary school closed in 1998.

== Flora and fauna ==
Most of the heather moors around Corgarff are managed for grouse. Narrow strips of heather, Ideally about half an hectare, are burned on a 7-10 year cycle creating a distinctive mosaic pattern on the hills. The burnt heather quickly sprouts forming fresh young shoots, the main food for the red grouse. The taller heather offers the grouse nesting sites and protection from predators such as foxes and carrion crow.

The mountain hare is a feature of the moorlands of Scotland, Its white coat in winter making it very distinctive on land without snow. In summer there is a blue tinge to its coat, hence its alternative name, the blue hare. The farmland around the River Don provides a breeding ground for waders such as redshank and lapwing. The redshank can be identified by its red legs. In flight it has a white triangular rump patch and white triangles on the tailing edges of the wings. The hysterical calls of the redshank at the approach of man has earned it the name "sentinel of the marshes". Lapwing are easily recognisable by their long crests, black and white under-markings and loud pee-wit call.

Orchids are present around Corgarff. between June and July, the pale lilac flowers of the heath-spotted orchid can be seen. The distinctive spotted leaves make this orchid easy to identify.

== History ==
Corgarff lies within the upper valley of the River Don. The Don rises to the south-west at the Wells of Don, flows east to Mossat where Strathdon meets Strathbogie, then on to Inverurie to meet the River Urie and finally on to the North Sea at Aberdeen. The open character of the valley is a result of changes during and after glaciation over 10,000 years ago.

The waters of the River Avon used to feed the River Don and this large river carved out the well developed valley. However, during glaciation the course of the River Avon was diverted northwards and now feeds the Spey, this process is known as watershed breaching. The force of the ice has also left areas of bare rock on the upper slopes and hilltops. Following the retreat of the ice the whole land surface was barren of growth, however the action of the ice on rocks had produced soils, which were later held in balance by deciduous trees. The first impact of man recognised by archaeology was around 3000AD when with primitive tools they started creating clearings for settlements. Traces of their Neolithic structures can still be found, such as cairns, cists and stone circles. The clearing of trees combined with reduction in average temperature resulted in soil deterioration. This led to the formation of the peaty, moors seen at Corgarff today.

Corgarff is in the Parish Of Upper Donside.

The parish used to be part of the great Celtic province of Mar, the most important of seven Pictish provinces which in 843 unified to become Scotland. The unification of Scotiand under a monarchy ended Upper Donside's isolation and began its role in national affairs. Unification brought with it the feudal system, where land was granted to important people in return for loyalty and military service. This dispersed power to the lairds who in turn had powers over a subordinate population. Tenants were expected to fight for the landowners. The feudal system differed from the clan system in that the tenants were linked to the laird by land rather than kinship. Although there were a number of smaller estates in the area, ultimately was dominated by two rival families, the Forbes and the Gordons. Many skirmishes occurred.

Castles were a major part of the feudal system and many survive from this medieval period. At first the feudal aristocracy built Norman style motte and bailey castles such as the Doune of Invernochty. This was the centre of power for the Earl of Mar until the 13th century, when Kildrummy Castle, a typical medieval castle was built. From the 14th century onwards social changes and the development of weapons resulted in castles being built to withstand casual raids rather than major sieges.

Corgarff Castle was one such example of a typical Scottish tower house with very little decoration. Defence was effected simply by shutting the entry and tiring from the many loopholes. There was no moat or curtain wall. Few castles were built after the 17th century and the relatively peaceful state of the country resulted in castlrs deslgned for comfort and architectural style rather than defence.

Corgarff Church was built in the 1830s by Sir Charles Forbes and closed in 2005. The church is rectangular, has windows on only one side and a bellcote.

Corgarff Community Hall was built in 1893. It houses an art exhibition featuring local artists and is used for polling.

The Corgarff War Memorial is between the Village Hall and Church. It is a grey granite cairn and was unveiled in 1920 by The Right Honourable Harold Tennant of Edinglassie.

== Art installations ==
“A Moment In Time” by Louise Gardiner is a large stone installation with a poem carved into the stone, which was designed to frame telescopic views of Corgarff Castle by looking through the spy holes. One looks towards the vast landscape, the other looks towards the castle. The A Moment In Time poem in full is “Take a moment to behold as still skies or storms unfold, warm your soul before you go, in sun, rain, sleet or snow.”

“The Watchers” by John Kennedy are four sculptural iron seats that are reminiscent of a stone circle, of which there are over 150 stone circles in Aberdeenshire alone. “The Watchers” overlook Corgarff Castle and the Cairngorms whilst providing shelter from the winds.

The Cairngorms Scenic Photo Posts Project was devised as a voluntary citizen science initiative, to gather and submit photographic records to better understand and track wildlife and habitat change in the National Park. This is post 16 out of 24 spread across the Cairngorms, which looks over the Corgarff View Point which frames Corgarff Castle within the vast landscape. It sits next to the two art installations.
