= Edom o Gordon =

Traditional song

Edom o Gordon or Captain Car (Child #178, Roud #80) is a traditional Scottish ballad that exists in several versions. The ballad recounts the gruesome events of Gordon's (or, in some versions, Car's) burning down of his enemy's castle that killed the lady of the house, her children and most of the servants.

== Synopsis ==
Edom o Gordon (or Captain Car) and his men need shelter from the cold weather of Martinmas and decide to seek it at the house of the Rodes. When the lady of the castle sees the troops arriving, she is disappointed that they are not those of her returning husband, but his enemy's. She climbs to the top of the tower and tries to negotiate with Gordon (or Car), but he demands that she open up the castle and, worse still, sleep with him. After she refuses, he vows to burn down the building with her three children still inside. To achieve this, he offers one of the servants, Jock, a fee for his help. He agrees and the fire is started. Attempting to save the youngest daughter, the lady throws some sheets down so that the besiegers might catch the baby but, instead, when she is thrown from the blaze, Gordon (or Car) impales her on the end of his spear.

While these grisly events are unfolding, the lord of the manor arrives and rushes over to the castle to save his wife and children but he is too late – they are all dead. He sets his own troops to battle those of his enemy and, from the ensuing battle, only five of Gordon's (or Car's) original fifty men return home.

== Commentary ==
The first printing of "Edom o Gordon" was in 1755 by Robert and Andrew Foulis. The story is thought to document a real historical event of 1571 as told in The Diurnall of Occurents (1755), although some of the details are speculative. Edom o Gordon is usually identified as Adam Gordon of Auchindoun, supporter of Mary, Queen of Scots, Captain Car as Captain Kerr, one of his lieutenants, and the lady of the castle as Margaret Forbes (née Campbell) of the Forbes clan (supporters of James VI and the Gordon clan's arch-enemies). The castle is thought not to be Rhodes Castle but the House of Towie (Toway) at Corgarff.

== See also ==
- Willie MacIntosh or The Burning of Auchindoun
- Clan Forbes
- Clan Gordon
- Corgarff Castle
- Lord Saltoun and Auchanachie or Auchanachie Gordon
- Poetry of Scotland
- Towie Castle

== Recordings ==
Malinky recorded Edom o Gordon on their 2005 album, The Unseen Hours.
