= Battle of Craibstone =

Sixteenth century Scottish clan battle

- Part of Clan Gordon - Clan Forbes feud, and the Marian civil war
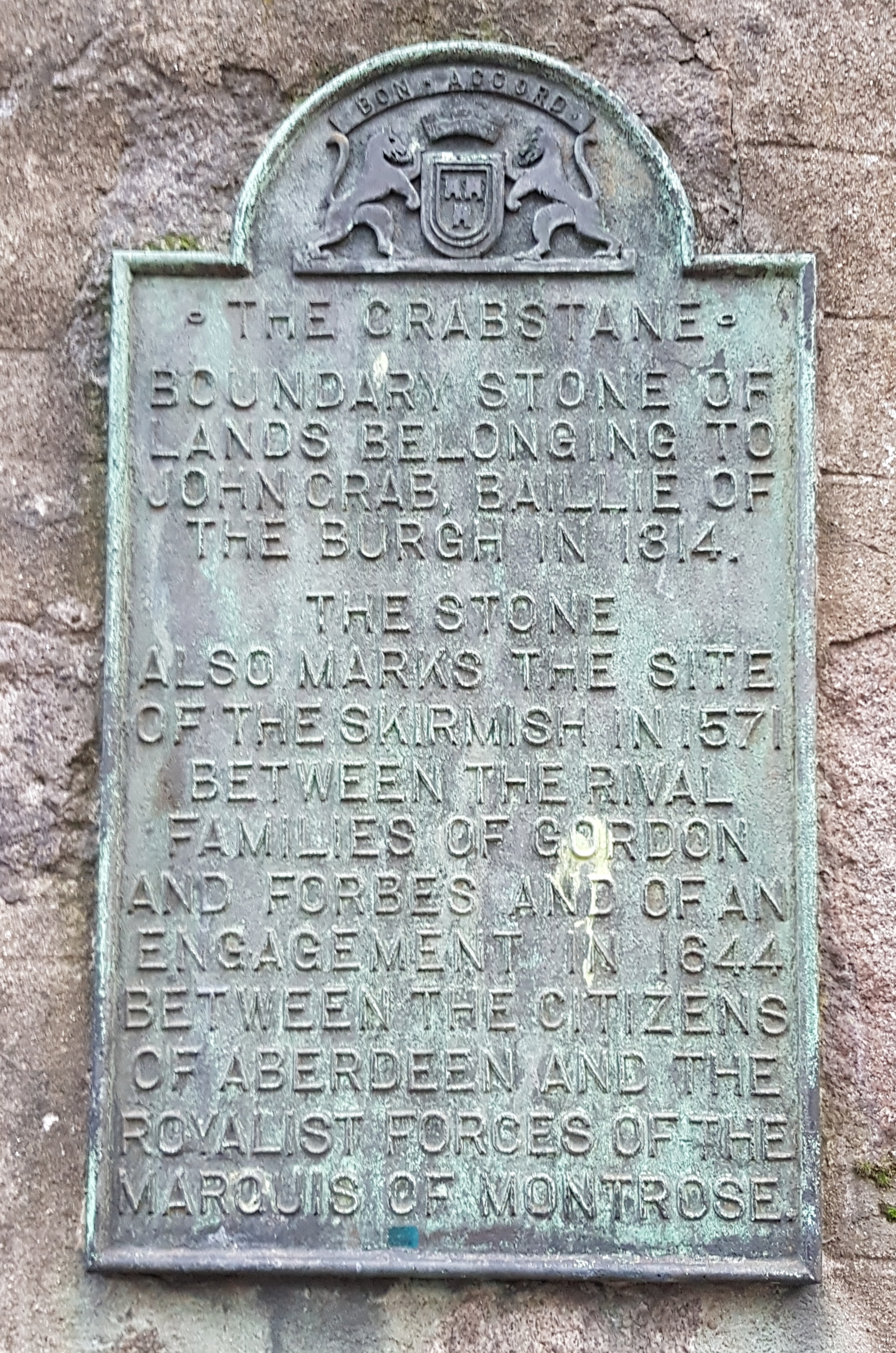
- Monument marking the site of the Battle of Craibstone
Date	20 November 1571
Location	Craibstone croft, Aberdeenshire
Result	Gordon victory

Belligerents
Clan Gordon and allies	Clan Forbes and allies

Commanders and leaders
Adam Gordon of Auchindoun; Captain Ker	Master of Forbes; Captain Chisholm; Captain Wedderburn; Alexander Campbell

Strength
800	900

Casualties and losses
60; 200	60; 300

The Battle of Craibstone was fought on 20 November 1571 between Clan Gordon and the Clan Forbes on an area that has now been constructed over, found in central Aberdeen, Scotland. It was part of the Marian civil war in which the Clan Forbes supported the King James VI and the Clan Gordon supported Mary, Queen of Scots.

So called due to its proximity to Craibstone Croft, the battle was won by the Gordons who forced the Forbes into retreat in approximately one hour with the loss of sixty men. According to news of the battle sent to John Lesley, the secretary of Mary, Queen of Scots, the number of casualties was three-score, 60 men, on each side, and the son of Lord Forbes, Alexander Master of Forbes, was imprisoned at Huntly Castle.

According to the chronicle Diurnal of Occurrents, the Master of Forbes accompanied by Captains Chisholm and Wedderburn marched from Cowie to Aberdeen on 20 November 1571. Chisholm and Wedderburn, the Regent's men, commanded two bands of musketeers called "hagbutters." Their whole strength was about 800 men. Adam Gordon of Auchindoun and Captain Ker had 900 men in the town. The Forbes came over the bridge of Aberdeen, and fought with Adam's men for an hour at Craibstone. The Forbes retreated, Chisholm and 300 men were killed, and the Master of Forbes and 200 men were captured. Two hundred Gordons were killed.

Richard Bannatyne mentions that some cavalry commanded by Alexander Campbell fought with the Forbes. Bannatyne says that the Forbes and the Regent's troops came to Aberdeen because they were short of food. Adam Gordon was reluctant to fight because he was outgunned, but saw his chance after the troops "foolishly" wasted their ammunition. The Forbes bowmen or archers fled, Bannatyne wrote they "gave backis, and did no guid." The Historie of King James Sext says there were 600 cavalrymen. The pursuit of the fleeing Forbes covered four miles. The Historie of James Sext (which is biased against the Regents of Scotland), says that the Gordons had only 30 casualties and the Forbes 300, although all the other sources make the number more evenly matched.
