= John Forbes (friar) =

Scottish Capuchin friar

John Forbes (1571–1606) was a Scottish Capuchin friar, known as Father Archangel.

== Life ==
Forbes was the second son of John Forbes, 8th Lord Forbes, by his first wife, Lady Margaret Gordon, eldest daughter of George Gordon, 4th Earl of Huntly, the leader of the Scottish Catholics at the time of the Reformation. Lord Forbes was a Protestant, and eventually drove his wife away. Their son John was a Catholic, as was his elder brother William, who had gone to Flanders and joined the Capuchin order, and his uncle, James Gordon, the Jesuit.

Having changed clothes with a shepherd boy, John Forbes crossed over the sea to Antwerp, where he was arrested by a soldier of the Spanish army and imprisoned as a spy in Antwerp Citadel. On recovering his liberty he learned Flemish and Latin; and on 2 August 1593 became a novice in the Capuchin monastery at Tournai. A year later he took the solemn vows. He lived in the houses of his order at Bruges and Antwerp. It is related that at Diksmuide he converted 300 Scottish soldiers to the catholic religion. His mother ultimately came to Flanders, and a pension was granted to her by the king of Spain. She died at Ghent on 1 January 1606, and her son John survived her only seven months, dying on 2 August 1606. He was buried in the nave of the Capuchin Church at Termonde. His brother William, also called in religion Father Archangel, died 21 March 1592.

== Biographies ==
The life of John Forbes was written in Latin by Faustinus Cranius of Diest, under the title of Alter Alexius, natione Scotus, nobili familia oriundus, nuper in Belgium felici S. Spiritus afflatu delatus, et in familiam Seraphici Patris S. Francisci Cappucinorum adscriptus, sub nomine F. Archangeli, Cologne, 1620. It was translated into Italian as Narrativa della Vita d'un Figlio et d'una Madre, Modena, 1634. An English version, with Forbes's portrait prefixed, engraved by J. Picart, was printed at Douay, 1623, together with a memoir of Father Benedict Canfield, and The Life of the Reverend Fa. Angel of Ioyevse, Capvchin Preacher. These three biographies had previously appeared in French at Paris in 1621.
