= Adam Gordon of Auchindoun =

Scottish knight (1545–1580)

Adam Gordon of Auchindoun (1545–1580) was a Scottish knight, younger brother of the Earl of Huntly and military leader during the Marian civil war on behalf of Mary, Queen of Scots in north west Scotland. In Scottish ballad lore, Adam became known as Edom o'Gordon.

== Supporter of Mary, Queen of Scots ==
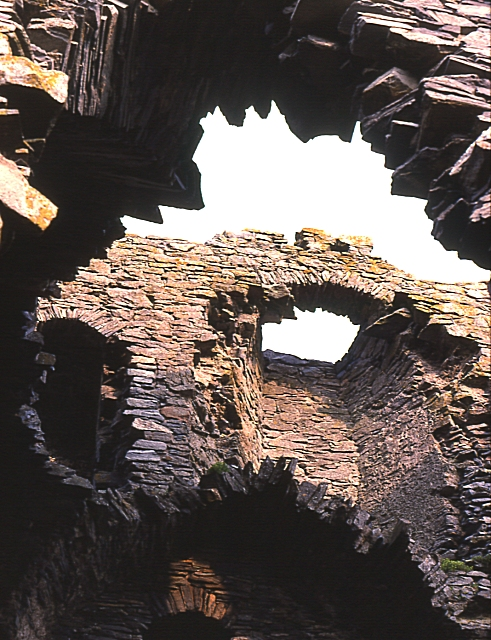
Ruins of Auchindoun Castle

Adam was the son of George Gordon, 4th Earl of Huntly and Elizabeth Keith, daughter of Robert Keith, Master of Marischal.

Adam Gordon was taken prisoner at the battle of Corrichie in 1562, but was restored to royal favour and made Laird of Auchindoun Castle. During the civil war he fought for the exiled Queen Mary, particularly against the Clan Forbes who followed the cause of James VI of Scotland against his mother. In March 1571, Jean Ruthven, Lady Methven wrote to her husband Henry Stewart, 2nd Lord Methven, fearful that Adam Gordon was coming to Arbroath.

In October 1571 Adam defeated the Forbes at the battle of Tillieangus. In November at Craibstone, or Aberdeen Bridge, he defeated the Forbes and a troop of the Regent's soldiers commanded by Captains Chisholm and Wedderburn. Adam then defeated an army of Regent Mar at Brechin. The major historical sources for Adam's role in the conflict are the near contemporary accounts of John Knox's secretary Richard Bannatyne and the chronicles, the Diurnal of Occurrents and History of King James the Sext.

== Battle of Tullieangus and the burning of Corgarff ==
Bannatyne said that Adam had 1,000 men at Tillieangus against 300 Forbes on 17 October 1571. Adam concealed his superior numbers to draw the Forbes into an ambush. The brother of Lord Forbes, Arthur Forbes was killed and 12 or 16 Forbes. William Forbes and 16 others were taken prisoner. Twenty-two Gordons were killed, including John Gordon of Buiky. Before Craibstone, he or his men were involved in a massacre of the Forbes family at Corgarff Castle. According to Bannatyne, 24 people were burnt to death in the castle including Lady Towie, although a day's truce was agreed. Only one escaped, by crawling through the heather and straw which the attackers had piled to fire the castle. The Diurnal says that Adam sent his lieutenant Captain Ker to Lady Towie to ask her to surrender "Carrigill or (Corgarffe)." When she said no, Adam ordered the place to be burnt, with about 27 casualties including Lady Towie and her daughters.

Gordon's kinsman, Alexander Gordon (bishop of Galloway) wrote from Edinburgh on 16 November 1571 with news of the battle at Tullieangus to Earl of Shrewsbury, who was the keeper of Mary, Queen of Scots. He intended to promote the Marian cause in England, writing "there was slain the principals of the gentlemen of the Forbes the number of 36, with my Lord Forbes's brother, one hundred taken, whereof my Lord Forbes' second son is one, and the rest brothers of Baronies and substantial gentlemen".

== Battle of Craibstone ==
According to the Diurnal, the Master of Forbes and Captains Chisholm and Wedderburn marched from Cowie to Aberdeen on 20 November 1571. Chisholm and Wedderburn, the Regent's men, commanded two bands of musketeers called "hagbutters." Their whole strength was about 800 men. Adam and Captain Ker had 900 men in the town. The Forbes came over the bridge of Aberdeen, and fought with Adam's men for an hour (at Craibstone). The Forbes retreated, Chisholm and 300 men were killed, and the Master of Forbes and 200 men were captured. Two hundred Gordons were killed. Bannatyne mentions that some cavalry commanded by Alexander Campbell fought with the Forbes. Bannatyne says that the Forbes and the Regent's troops came to Aberdeen because they were short of food. Adam was reluctant to fight because he was outgunned, but saw his chance after the troops wasted their ammunition. The Forbes bowmen or archers fled, Bannatyne wrote they "gave backis, and did no guid."

A chronicle written by an Aberdeen man, Walter Cullen, records the casualties at 'Craibstayne' as about 60, three score, on each side (unless this a copyist's error for three hundred), and mentions the death of 'Guid' Duncan Forbes. The chronicle History of King James of Sext described Adam's vigilance in Aberdeen as like a "valiant chiftayne, having alwayis his men in reddienes," and adds there were 600 cavalrymen against him. The fleeing Forbes were pursued for four miles. According to the History of James Sext (which has a bias against the Regents of Scotland), there were 300 Forbes casualties against thirty Gordons. Adam's victories against the Forbes were marred by the "infamy" of the burning of the Lady Towie.

== Exile and death ==
Adam was included in the peace called the "Pacification of Perth" of 23 February 1573. He was then allowed to go to France, where he tried to rally support for Queen Mary. Then in 1574, Adam was in touch with the English diplomat in Scotland, Henry Killigrew, and in France, and Francis Walsingham trying to secure his reconciliation with Regent Morton. At the same time, his brother, the 5th Earl of Huntly, wrote to Elizabeth I of England distancing himself from Adam's activities in France. In September 1574, Morton arrested Alexander Duff, a servant of Adam Gordon who came to Scotland.

In the summer of 1575 Adam Gordon returned to Scotland and was imprisoned at Blackness Castle, then in 1577 released under a bond to live in Galloway. On 9 April 1580, Adam Gordon came to Stirling when, according to John Cunningham of Drumquhassle there was a scare that James VI might be abducted to Dumbarton Castle and taken to France.

He died at Perth on 27 October 1580.
