= Clan Forbes =

Highland Scottish clan

- Foirbeis
- Motto: Grace, me guide.
- War cry: "Lonach" (a hill in Strath Don).

Profile
- Plant badge: Broom.
- Pipe music: March "Cath Ghlinn Eurainn" ("The Battle of Glen Eurann").

Chief
- Malcolm Nigel Forbes
- 23rd Lord Forbes
- Seat: Castle Forbes
- Historic seat: Culloden House
Allied clans
Clan Mackay
Clan Campbell
Clan Mackintosh
Clan Fraser
Rival clans
Clan Gordon
Clan Kennedy

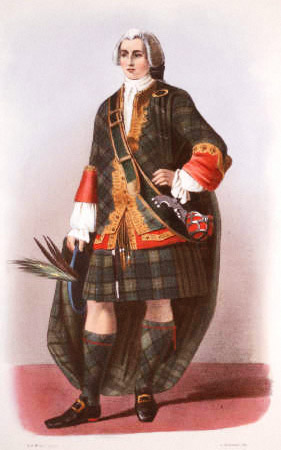
A Victorian-era illustration of a Clan Forbes Chief by R. R. McIan from The Clans of the Scottish Highlands published in 1845.

Clan Forbes is a Lowland Scottish clan from Aberdeenshire, Scotland.

== History ==
=== Origins ===
The name Forbes is most probably a location name assumed from the lands of Forbes in Aberdeenshire, in possession of this family reputedly since the time of King William the Lion. While there are many legends surrounding the origin of this clan, historians write that the Forbes are descended from Kings of the Picts and a reliable tradition tells that the "Braes o' Forbes" were once uninhabitable because of bears living in the area. Oconachar, founder of the clan, killed the bears and claimed the land as "first occupier". The present chief still holds part of the Lordship of these Forbes lands. The first person on record was Duncan Forbes who in 1271–2 received a grant of lands from Alexander III of Scotland. Cited by William Forbes Skene the charter exists in the Forbes charter chest in tattered but quite legible condition.

The next mention is a John Forbes, whose name dates from a 1306 roll containing a list of demands by English and Scottish loyalists to Edward I of England for the forfeited lands of Scotsmen, the lands of John Forbes being demanded or requested by both a William Comyn and a Robert Chival. The next name may be that of his son, Christian, who received a grant of one-third of the lands of Skeith and Ardach by King Robert the Bruce in 1326, but doubt still remains he was a Forbes or of this family, even though in the charter he is named Christian Forbes.

The next name found in records is that of John Forbes dominus ejusdem or Lord of Forbes. He witnessed two charters of Thomas, Earl of Mar in 1358 and 1359, and in 1364 King David II of Scotland confirmed a charter for the lands of Edinbanchory and Craiglogy by Thomas, Earl of Mar granting them to John de Forbes. He was Sheriff of Aberdeen in 1374. In 1378, a charter was granted to John and his wife Margaret by the Bishop of Moray for the lands of Fynrossie on the loch of Spynie. At his death before 20 August 1387, he was described as "a gude man, wise, and mychty, and manly in his time."

The son of the latter, Sir John de Forbes, Lord of Forbes, called "Sir John of the black lip" was Justiciary and Coroner of Aberdeenshire. He married Elizabeth Kennedy, daughter of Sir Gilbert Kennedy of Dunure and together they had four sons. From the three younger sons sprang several cadet lines. William was the progenitor of the Pitsligo line, John the ancestor of Tolquhonline while the houses of Skellater and Inverernan were founded by Alistair of Brux. Sir John died in 1406.

=== 15th century ===
Sir John Forbes's son, Alexander Forbes, 1st Lord Forbes fought at the Battle of Harlaw in 1411, in support of Alexander Stewart, Earl of Mar. Alexander had safe conduct from Henry V of England to visit his king, James I of Scotland at Rouen in 1421 and was allowed as his escort to bring forty Pikeman and other followers, up to one hundred men. He married Elizabeth, daughter of George Douglas, 1st Earl of Angus and his wife Mary, daughter of Robert III of Scotland. Together Alexander and Elizabeth had five children including James, the 2nd Lord Forbes. Alexander Forbes was raised to the Peerage by James I as Baron Forbes between October 1444 and July 1445. Alexander Forbes, 1st Lord Forbes died in 1448.

James, second Lord Forbes, married Egidia, daughter of William Keith, 1st Earl Marischal, and had three sons: William, the 3rd Lord Forbes, Duncan, ancestor of the Forbeses of Corsindae and Monymusk, and Patrick, ancestor of the Forbeses, Baronets of Craigievar, now Lord Sempill, and also of the Earls of Granard.

Alexander, fourth Lord Forbes, was in arms with his clan to revenge the murder of James III, but after the defeat at Tillymoss he submitted to James IV. John, the sixth Lord, succeeded his brother Arthur, the 5th Lord Forbes, in 1493. In 1536 he was charged with treason and was imprisoned in Edinburgh Castle, but was honourably acquitted after a long period of confinement. John Forbes, Master of Forbes, his eldest surviving son and heir designate was arrested with his father, also on charges of treason, and was condemned to be hanged, but due to his rank he was beheaded.

=== 16th century ===
In 1529, Clan Forbes was involved in a feud with the citizens of Aberdeen, who withheld a sort of blackmail, a yearly tun of wine for the fishings of the Don. In July 1530 Arthur Forbes of Brux and his accomplices attacked Aberdeen. The citizens took arms and drove the invaders to Greyfriars Place. The street fights lasted twenty-four hours. One member of clan Forbes and some of the citizens were killed, a good many on both sides were wounded. Several of the inhabitants of Aberdeen, and commissioners were sent to the king to lodge a complaint. On 19 December the following year, the magistrates served letters of law-burrows against Pitsligo, Tolquhon, Corsindae, Brux, Echt, and other gentlemen of the name of Forbes and Lord Pitsligo was obliged to find caution to the council at Perth for his own and friends good behaviour towards the town of Aberdeen. At that time a deadly feud subsisted between Clan Forbes and Clan Leslie; and it is probable that some of the Aberdeen townsfolk had interfered in that quarrel, which furiously raged throughout Aberdeenshire, and was attended by mutual massacres and murders.

Throughout the 16th century the Clan Forbes were involved in a long and bitter struggle against the Clan Gordon. In the 1520s there were murders by both sides, and one of the most prominent killed by the Forbeses was Seton of Meldrum who was a close connection of the Earl of Huntly, chief of Clan Gordon. The Earl of Huntly then became involved in a plot against the Master of Forbes, who was the son of the sixth Lord Forbes. The sixth Lord Forbes had been heavily implicated of the murder of Seton of Meldrum. The Master of Forbes was accused by the Earl of Huntly of conspiring to assassinate James V of Scotland in 1536 by shooting at him with a cannon. The Master of Forbes was tried and sentenced to be executed; just days later, however, his conviction was reversed and the Forbes family was restored to favor. The Protestant Reformation added to the feud between the Clan Forbes and Clan Gordon in that the Gordons remained Catholic and the Forbeses became Protestant. The traditional enemies of the Forbeses, such as the Clan Leslie, Clan Irvine and Clan Seton, sided with the Gordons, while Protestant families, such as the Clan Keith, Clan Fraser and Clan Crichton, sided with the Clan Forbes. Twenty Gordons were killed at a banquet held at the Forbeses' Druminnor Castle in 1571. Later in 1571 the feud climaxed with the Battle of Tillieangus, and the Battle of Craibstone, and Druminnor, then the seat of the chief of Clan Forbes, was plundered. The Gordons followed this with the massacre of twenty-seven Forbeses of Towie at Corgarff Castle. It took two Acts of Parliament for the clans to put down their arms.

=== 17th century ===
Alexander, the 10th Lord Forbes, was a Lieutenant general under Gustavus Adolphus during the Thirty Years' War. On his return to Scotland he was given a commission and charged with suppressing uprisings in Ireland. He later retired to Germany and died on 20 April 1672 in Stockholm, Sweden.

=== 18th century ===
During the Jacobite risings the Jacobites laid siege to Culloden House, seat of Duncan Forbes, Lord Culloden, a staunch Whig, in both the Jacobite rising of 1715 and the Jacobite rising of 1745. General Wade's report on the Highlands in 1724 gives the number of men under of Forbes of Culloden as two hundred. In September 1745, he was given a commission to raise twenty Independent Highland Companies to oppose the Jacobite rising of 1745. He succeeded in raising a total of eighteen Independent Highland Companies to fight against the Jacobites.

== Branches ==
The Lords Forbes of Pitsligo were descended from William, second son of Sir John Forbes of that Ilk, in the time of Robert II. Alexander, fourth Lord, was attainted after the battle of Culloden; living long secretly in one of his own gate lodges, he died in 1762. Three families now claim the title.

The Forbeses, Baronets of Craigievar, a branch of the old House, Craigievar Castle, sprang from Patrick Forbes of Corse, armour-bearer to James III; and the Stuart-Forbesses of Pitsligo, Baronets, from Duncan of Corsindae, second son of James, second Lord Forbes. The Edinglassie Forbeses are also a branch of the parent stock.

The Forbeses of Tolquhon Castle, a very old branch, acquired that estate in 1420, and were progenitors of the Lairds of Culloden. Sir Alexander Forbes of Tolquhon commanded a troop of cavalry in the Scots army at Worcester; and when the King's horse was shot, mounted him on his own, put his buff coat and a bloody scarf about him, and saw him safe out of the field. The fortunes of this house were probably consumed in the fever of the Darien Scheme, in which Alexander Forbes of Tolquhon (like many other good old Scottish families) appears to have embarked beyond his means, the stock he held (500) having been judicially attached.

Sir William Forbes, eighth Baronet of Craigievar, in 1884 succeeded his kinswoman as Lord Sempill, Chief of Clan Sempill.

The Forbses of Brux were prominent Jacobites present at both the 1715 and 1745 risings, and who later established themselves in India with the East India Company before migrating to Australia at the beginning of the Nineteenth Century. Colonial politician and Speaker of the Legislative Assembly of Queensland, Frederick Augustus Forbes, was descended from this Brux branch.

== Tartans ==
Tartan image	Notes
	Forbes Tartan, Scottish Register of Tartans #1214, Approved by Malcolm, 23rd Lord Forbes, Chief of Clan Forbes.

== Clan chief ==
- Clan Chief: Malcolm Forbes, 23rd Lord Forbes and Chief of the Name and Arms of Forbes.

== Castles ==
Castles that have been owned by the Clan Forbes have included amongst many others:

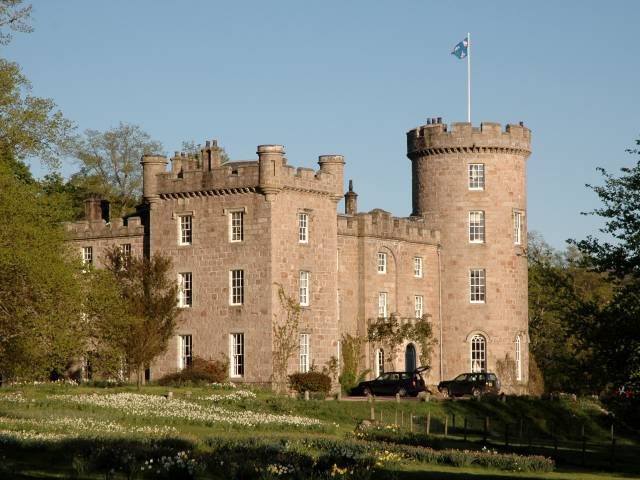
Castle Forbes, the current seat of the chief of Clan Forbes

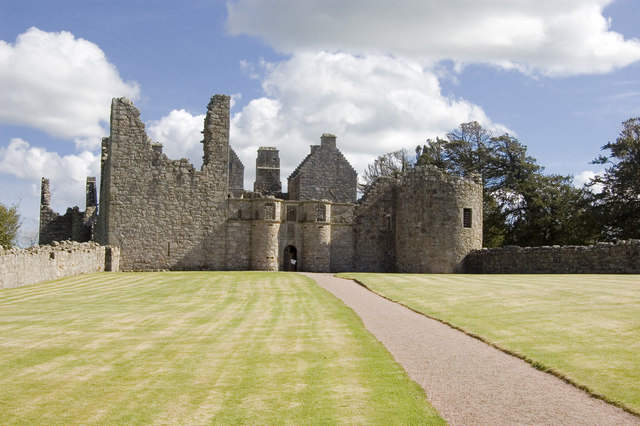
The ruins of Tolquhon Castle, seat of the Forbes of Tolquhon branch of the clan

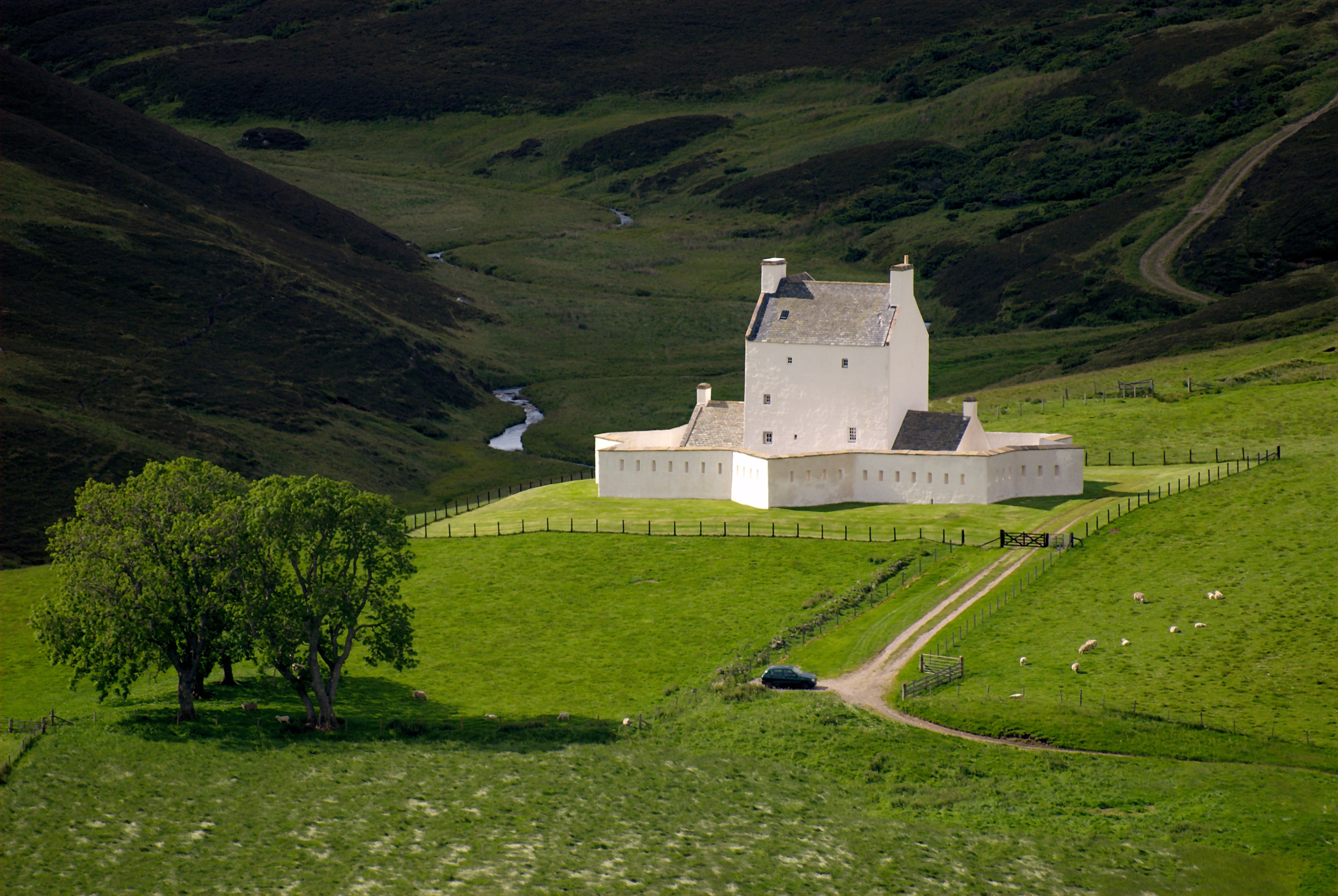
Corgarff Castle

- Castlehill at Druminnor, one and a half miles north-east of Rhynie, Aberdeenshire, was the site of the first stronghold on the lands, which the Forbeses held from 1271 to 1440. They then moved to Druminnor Castle.
- Druminnor Castle, one mile south-east of Rhynie, Aberdeenshire, consists of a keep and tower that has been much altered and was first built by the Forbeses in the fifteenth century. It was modified in the sixteenth century when it was made into an L-plan and there have also been later alterations. The Forbeses feuded with the Leslies, Setons, and the powerful Clan Gordon; twenty Gordons were killed at a banquet held at Druminnor Castle in 1571. In 1770 Druminnor Castle was sold, and the Forbes family moved to Castle Forbes.
- Castle Forbes, a few miles northeast of Alford, Aberdeenshire, was once a tower house, but was replaced with a large castellated mansion of 1815.
- Craigievar Castle, four and a half miles southwest of Alford, Aberdeenshire, was built by the Forbeses. It is an L-plan tower house of seven storeys. The castle was actually started by the Mortimer family but they ran out of money and it was completed by the Forbeses. The castle was taken over by the National Trust for Scotland in 1963 and is now open to the public.
- Tolquhon Castle, four miles east of Oldmeldrum, Aberdeenshire, is a ruinous keep and courtyard castle. The original castle was built by the Prestons of Craigmillar, but it passed by marriage to the Forbeses in 1420, and they completed the castle. Sir Alexander Forbes, sixth laird of the castle, was killed at the Battle of Pinkie Cleugh in 1547. The present castle was built by William Forbes, the seventh laird. The tenth Forbes laird of Tolquhon saved Charles II of England's life at the Battle of Worcester in 1651. In 1716 the Forbeses sold the castle to the Farquhars to help cover their losses in the Darien scheme, but the eleventh Forbes laird had to be forcibly removed from the castle by a detachment of soldiers in 1718.
- Corgarff Castle is in a remote spot ten miles northwest of Ballater, Aberdeenshire, and is a tall tower house. It is four storeys high and dates from the sixteenth century. It is the site of one of the most infamous events of the bitter feud between the Clan Forbes and Clan Gordon: a force under Adam Gordon of Auchindoun ravaged through the Forbeses' lands and besieged the castle, which was held by twenty-six women, children, and servants, the men being away. Margaret Campbell, wife of Forbes of Towie, refused to surrender the castle. Gordon of Auchindoun lost patience when she shot one of his men in the knee; Gordon then torched the building, killing everyone inside.
- Culloden House at Culloden, Highland near Inverness mostly dates from the eighteenth century, but stands on the site of a strong tower house which was formerly held by the Mackintoshes and Edmonstones, but was sold to the Forbeses in 1626. It was the seat of Duncan Forbes, Lord Culloden, who supported the British-Hanoverian Government during the Jacobite rising of 1745 and was present at the Battle of Culloden. He later protested against the cruel and dishonorable treatment of Jacobite prisoners after the battle, when many wounded Jacobites were brought to Culloden House and were shot or had their heads crushed with musket butts.

== See also ==
- John Forbes and Company
- Colquhonnie Castle
