= Corgarff Castle =

Castle in Aberdeenshire, Scotland

Corgarff Castle
- Aberdeenshire; Near Corgarff in Scotland
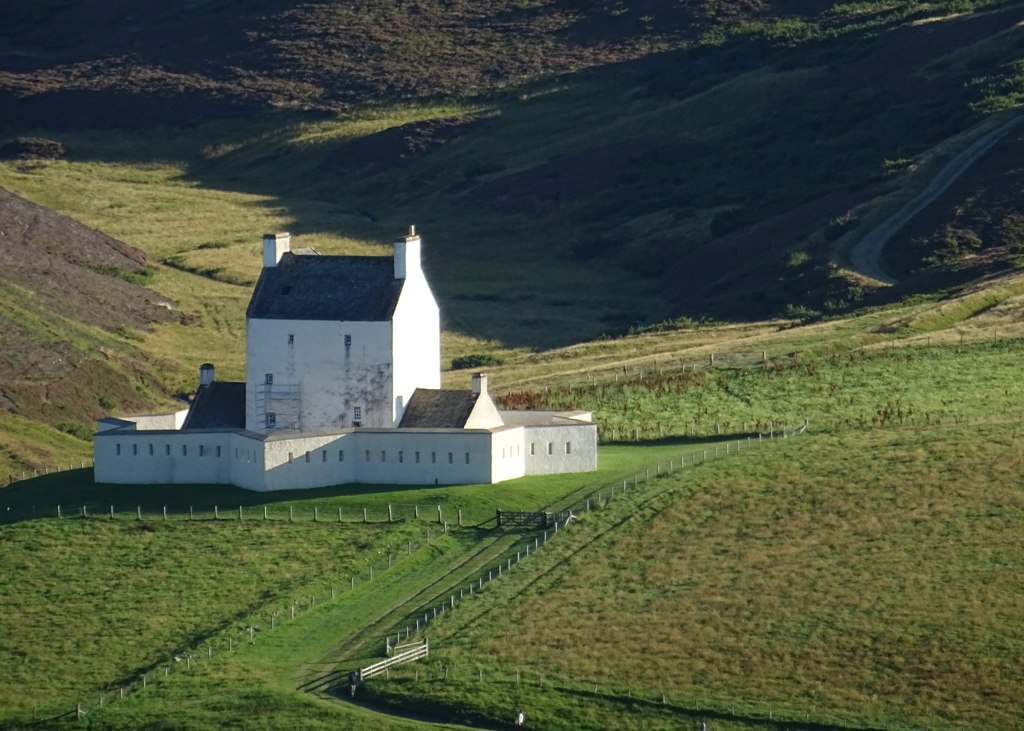
- Corgarff Castle in 2022

Site information
- Type: Castle
- Owner: Historic Environment Scotland
- Open to the public: Yes
- Condition: Restored
- Website: Historic Environment Scotland

Location
- Coordinates: 57°9′46″N 3°14′3″W

Site history
- Built: Mid-16th century Rebuilt in mid-18th century
- Built by: Clan Forbes
- In use: 16th Century-1831
- Events: Razed in 1571 by Adam Gordon

Scheduled monument
- Official name: Corgarff Castle
- Type: Secular: barracks; castle
- Designated: 30 December 1936
- Reference no.: SM90080

Corgarff Castle is located slightly west of the village of Corgarff, in Aberdeenshire, north-east Scotland. It stands by the Lecht road, which crosses the pass between Strathdon and Tomintoul.

== History ==
The castle was built around 1530 by the Elphinstone family and leased to the Forbes of Towie. In 1571, it was burned by their enemy, Adam Gordon of Auchindoun, resulting in the deaths of Margaret Campbell, Lady Forbes, her children, and numerous others, 26 in total, and probably giving rise to the ballad Edom o Gordon.

In May 1607, the castle was captured from Alexander, 4th Lord Elphinstone by Alexander Forbes of Towie and his companions, including a piper called George McRobie. They used hammers and battering rams to break down the gate, then fortified the house with a garrison of "Highland thieves and limmers".

In 1626, it was acquired by the Earl of Mar. In 1645, it was used as an assembly point by the troops of the Marquis of Montrose. It was burned again in both 1689 and 1716 by Jacobite supporters. It was resettled by the Forbes family in 1745 but had to be forfeited due to their Jacobite leanings.

In 1748, it was bought by the British government and rebuilt and extended as a barracks. A detachment of government troops were stationed there, on the military road from Braemar Castle to Fort George, Inverness. Military use continued as late as 1831, after which the tower was used to suppress illegal whisky distilling in the surrounding area. It remained part of the Delnadamph estate belonging to the Stockdale family until they passed the castle into state care in 1961 and gave the ownership of the castle to the Lonach Highland and Friendly Society.

It is now in the care of Historic Environment Scotland and is open to the public for seasonal periods. It has been designated a scheduled monument.
