= John Forbes, 6th Lord Forbes =

Scottish landowner (d. 1547)

Arms of Lord Forbes

John Forbes, 6th Lord Forbes (died 1547) was a Scottish landowner.

He was the son of William Forbes, 3rd Lord Forbes and Christian Gordon, daughter of Alexander Gordon, 1st Earl of Huntly.

He became Lord Forbes after the death of his brother Arthur in 1493.

In 1528 he accompanied James V to Edinburgh from Stirling Castle and swore the "great oath" against the Douglas family.

He was involved in a feud in Aberdeen and the killing of Alexander Seton of Meldrum. In 1530 he was ordered to compensate Lord Elphinstone for an attack on Kildrummy Castle in 1525.

In 1536 he was charged with treason and was imprisoned in Edinburgh Castle and was released in 1538.

In 1542 Forbes and the Earl of Huntly fought in the north of Scotland.

He died in 1547.

== Marriages and children ==
John Forbes married Catherine Stewart, daughter of John Stewart, 1st Earl of Atholl and Eleanor Sinclair. Their children included:

- Elizabeth Forbes, who married John Grant of Freuchie (died 1585)

John Forbes married secondly Christian Lundie or Lundin. Their children included:

- John Forbes, Master of Forbes (d. 1537), who married Elizabeth Lyon, daughter of John Lyon, 6th Lord Glamis and Janet Douglas. He was executed for treason on three counts, plotting to kill the king with a handgun, sedition at Jedburgh, and assisting the English against the king's army in 1533.
- William Forbes, 7th Lord Forbes (d. 1593)
- Margaret Forbes
- Elizabeth Forbes
- Marjory Forbes

John Forbes' third wife was Elizabeth Berlay, widow of Lord Elphinstone. Their children included:

- Arthur Forbes of Putachie, known as "Black Arthur", who was killed at the battle of Tillieangus in October 1571.
- Jean or Janet Forbes, who married (1) John Stewart, 3rd Earl of Atholl, (2) Alexander Hay of Delgatie, (3) William Leslie of Balquhain.

His daughter with Helen Rutherford, Annabell Forbes, married the family genealogist Matthew Lumsden.

Peerage of Scotland
Preceded by Arthur Forbes	Lord Forbes; 1493–1547	Succeeded by William Forbes
