= Battle of Tillieangus =

1571 battle

- Part of Clan Gordon – Clan Forbes feud and Marian civil war
Date	10 October 1571
Location	White Hill of Tillyangus, Aberdeenshire, Scotland
Result	Gordon victory

Belligerents
Clan Gordon	Clan Forbes

Commanders and leaders
Sir Adam Gordon	Black Arthur Forbes

The Battle of Tillieangus was fought on 10 October 1571 between the Clan Gordon and the Clan Forbes near White Hill of Tillyangus, Aberdeenshire, Scotland. It was part of the Marian civil war in which the Gordons supported Mary, Queen of Scots and the Forbeses supported her son, James VI of Scotland.

== Battle ==
On 10 October 1571, a force of Catholic Gordons, under the command of Sir Adam Gordon, was on its way to gain the Suie Road to Edinburgh, to join George Gordon, the Earl of Huntly. They were opposed by a force of Protestant Forbes under the command of "Black Arthur" Forbes, the 6th Lord Forbes's youngest son. The forces met near the White Hill of Tillyangus, where the Gordons were victorious. Black Arthur Forbes was killed. Legend has it that "he stooped down to quench his thirst and one of the Gordons gave him his death blow through an open joint in his armour". On the Gordon side, John Gordon of Buckie was killed.

The battle was mentioned in a letter of the Bishop of Galloway to the Earl of Shrewsbury of 16 November 1571. He mentions the death of 36 gentlemen of the name of Forbes with Lord Forbes's brother, and 100 prisoners taken including a younger son of Lord Forbes.

== Archaeology ==
In about 1800 a large quantity of human bones were found at the site of what are traditionally the burial cairns of the Battle of Tillieangus.
