= Tolquhon Castle =

Castle in Aberdeenshire, Scotland

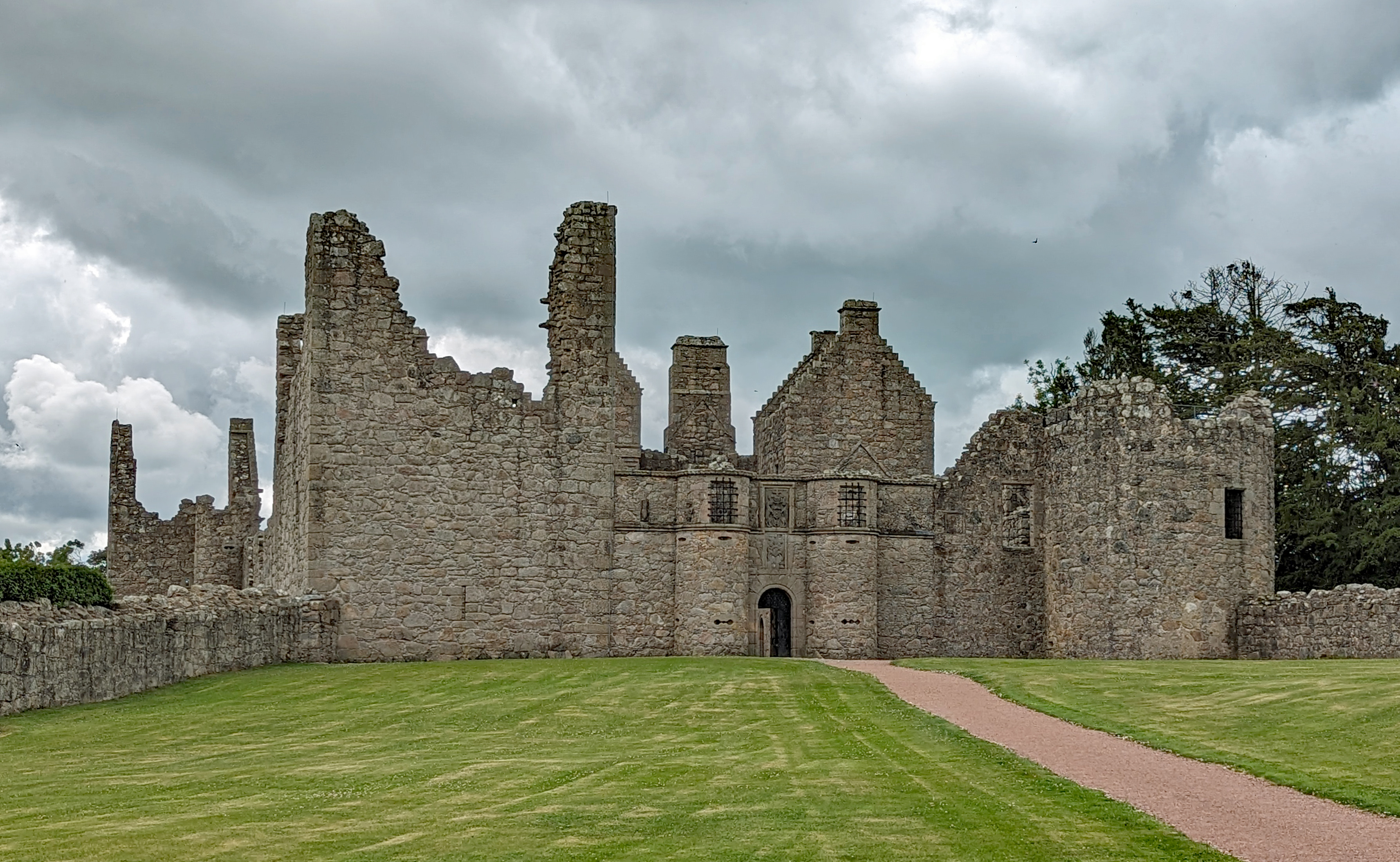
- The castle in 2023

Location
- Coordinates: 57.3481°N 2.2132°W

Site history
- Built: 1584-1589
- Built by: William Forbes

Scheduled monument
- Official name: Tolquhon Castle
- Type: Secular: castle; garden; gateway; tower; well; yett
- Designated: 31 December 1921
- Reference no.: SM90302

Tolquhon Castle (/tæˈhuːn/ ta-HOON) is a ruined late-16th-century castle in Aberdeenshire, north-east Scotland. It lies about 1.5 miles (2.4 km) north-west of Pitmedden and 2 miles (3.2 km) south of Tarves.

The castle was built between 1584 and 1589 by William Forbes, 7th Laird of Tolquhon, as an extension to the earlier tower house known as Preston's Tower. It has been described as “the most characteristic château of the Scots Renaissance”.

Tolquhon Castle is a scheduled monument and is in the care of Historic Scotland, and is open to the public.

== History ==
Preston's Tower was constructed in the early 15th century, either by Sir Henry Preston or by his son-in-law Sir William Forbes, who inherited part of the Preston lands in 1420 following Sir Henry's death. His descendant William Forbes, 7th Laird of Tolquhon (died 1596), began work on a new castle in 1584, retaining Preston's Tower while adding new and more comfortable accommodation. He also improved the gardens and parkland surrounding the house.

King James VI was entertained at Tolquhon in July 1589. The new buildings were arranged around a courtyard and included an elaborate gatehouse and a first-floor gallery. An inscription on the gatehouse records that “AL THIS WARKE EXCEP THE AULD TOWR WAS BEGUN BE WILLIAM FORBES 15 APRIL 1584 AND ENDIT BE HIM 20 OCTOBER 1589”.

The home of a "Renaissance man", Tolquhon was designed for display rather than defence and was the work of the mason-architect Thomas Leper or Leiper. Leper’s distinctive triple shot-holes flank the main entrance and are also found at nearby Arnage Castle and Dean Castle in Ayrshire. Also unusual is the stone tilework in the main hall.

After William Forbes’ death, his descendants continued to occupy Tolquhon until 1718, when they were forced to leave due to debts incurred by the failure of the Darien scheme. The castle subsequently fell into decay and is now a ruin. The site was subsequently sold to the Farquharsons around this time.

== Description ==
The main entrance is on the north range of the castle, with Preston's Tower forming the north-east corner. The gallery occupies the first floor of the west range, while the main hall is located in the south range and is accessed via a stair from the courtyard. A prison was situated within the south-east tower.

To the north of the main quadrangle lies the walled outer courtyard, which contains the remains of a doocot.

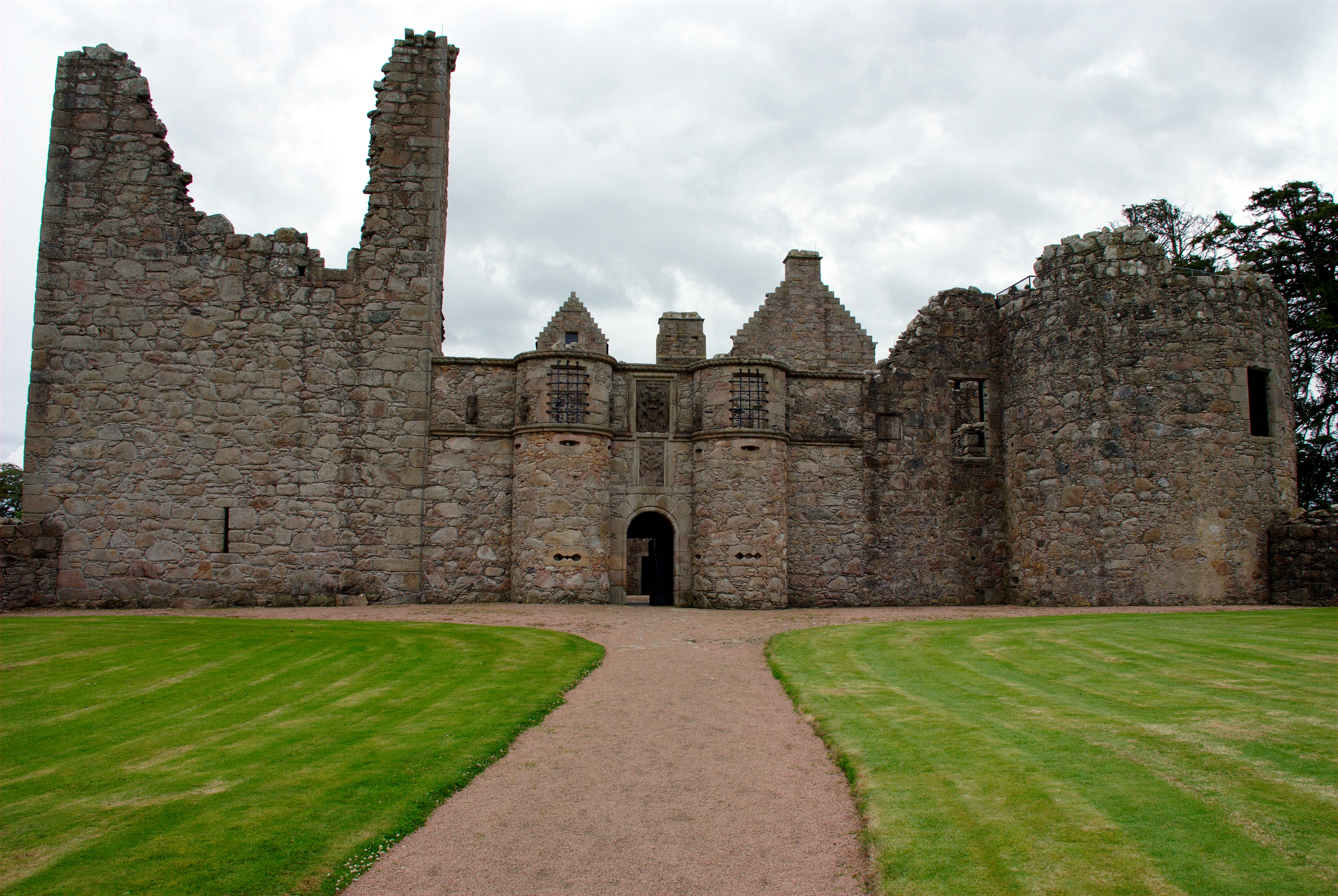
View from front

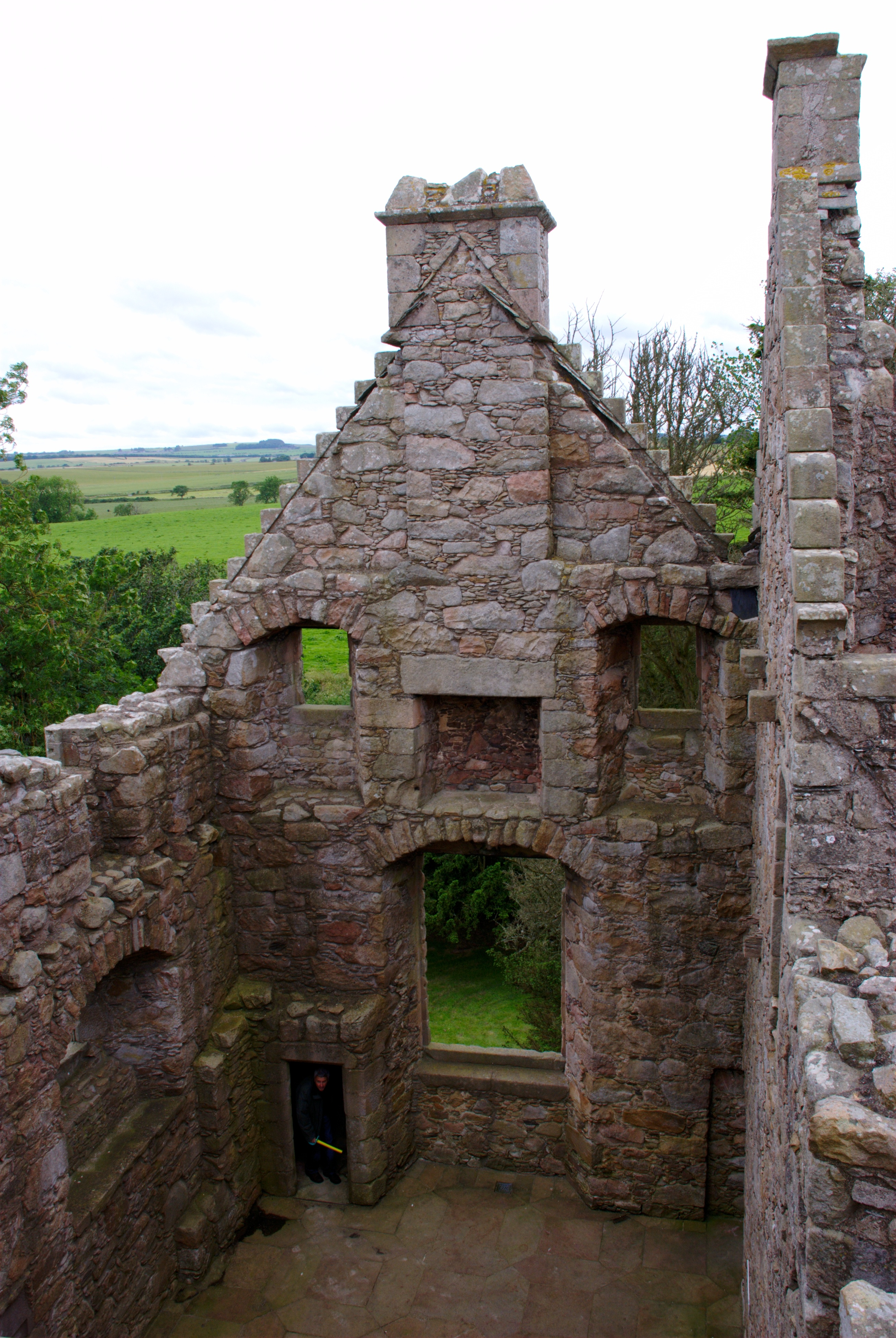
Main hall from above

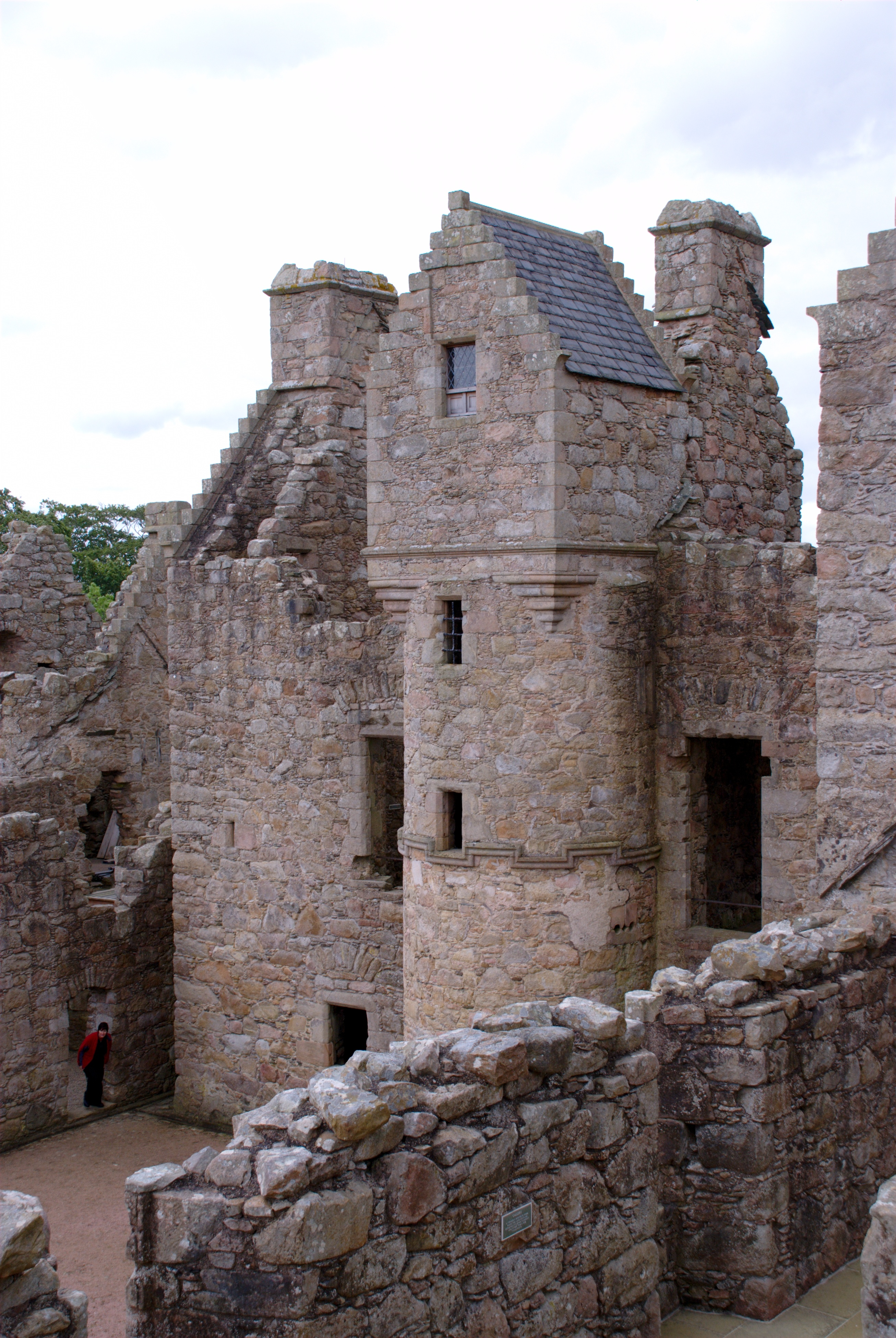
Central courtyard and rear living area

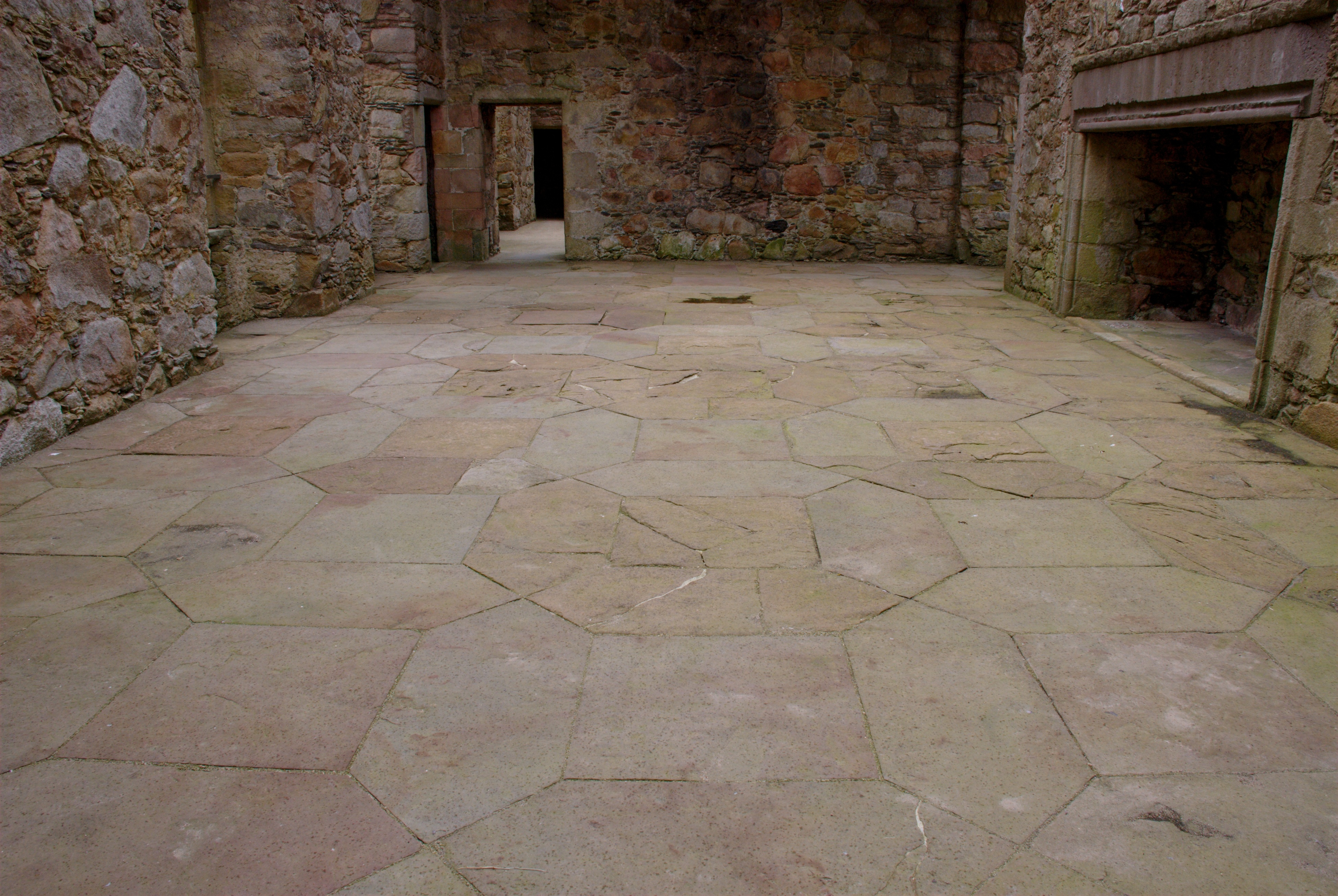
Detail of stone tile floor in main hall

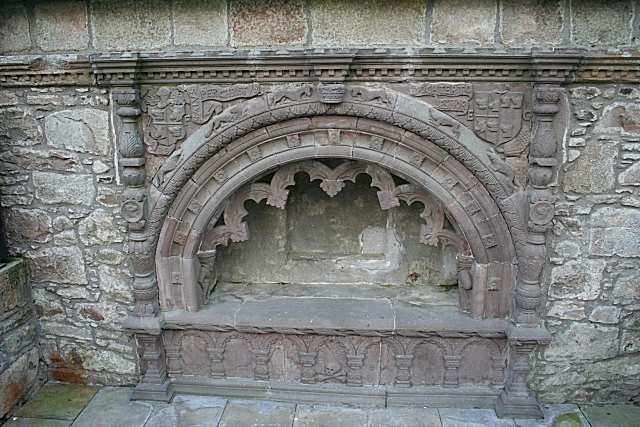
The Tolquhon tomb in Tarves churchyard, erected in 1589 by William Forbes, 7th Laird of Tolquhon, to commemorate himself and his wife Elizabeth Gordon

== See also ==
- Clan Forbes
- Clan Farquharson
