= Sir Ewan Forbes, 11th Baronet =

Nobleman, doctor and trans man (1912-1991)

Sir Ewan Forbes Bt
- Born: Elizabeth Forbes-Sempill; 6 September 1912
- Died: 12 September 1991 (aged 79)
- Other name: Ewan Forbes-Sempill
- Occupations: General practitioner, farmer
- Spouse: Isabella Mitchell (m. 1952)
- Parent(s): John Forbes-Sempill, 18th Lord Sempill; Gwendolyn Prodger

Sir Ewan Forbes, 11th Baronet, (6 September 1912 – 12 September 1991), was a Scottish nobleman, general practitioner and farmer. Forbes was a trans man; he was officially registered as the youngest daughter of John, Lord Sempill. After an uncomfortable upbringing, he began presenting as a man in the 1930s, following a course of medical treatments in Germany. He formally re-registered his birth as male in 1952, changing his name to Ewan, and was married a month later.

In 1965, he stood to inherit the baronetcy of his elder brother William, Lord Sempill, together with a large estate. This inheritance was challenged by his cousin, who argued that the re-registration was invalid; under this interpretation, Forbes would legally be considered a woman, and thus unable to inherit the baronetcy. The legal position was unclear, and it took three years before a ruling by the Court of Session, which held him to be intersex, finally led to the Home Secretary recognising his claim to the title. The case was heard in great secrecy, with the effect that it was unable to be considered in other judgments on the legal recognition of gender variance, but has become more widely known since his death in 1991.

== Family background ==
The Forbeses were a well-established Aberdeenshire noble family, holders of both a barony and a baronetcy. The baronetcy had been bestowed in 1630, and was restricted to heirs male. In 1884 Sir William Forbes, the eighth baronet, inherited his cousin Maria's title as Lord Sempill and took the surname of Forbes-Sempill. On William's death in 1905, both titles passed to his eldest son, John.

John, the new Lord Sempill and Baronet, was a land owner and soldier who had served with the Lovat Scouts and then the Black Watch in the South African War. He would later command the 8th Battalion of the Black Watch during the First World War, in which he was wounded at the Battle of Loos. During the 1880s, he had met Gwendolyn Prodger at the fashionable German resort of Bad Homburg; the couple were married on 22 June 1892. The bride, from a Cornish background, had been brought up in Wales and was an accomplished harpist.

The couple had four children. The eldest, William, was born in 1893, shortly after their marriage. William later became an engineer, aviator, and spy for the Japanese. There were then two daughters; Gwendolyn (also known as Gwyneth), who died of appendicitis before Ewan's birth, and Margaret, who later became a decorated member of the Women's Auxiliary Air Force in the Second World War and a Justice of the Peace, before dying in a car accident in 1966.

Finally, on 6 September 1912, a fourth child was born, christened Elizabeth Forbes-Sempill, and known to the family as "Betty".

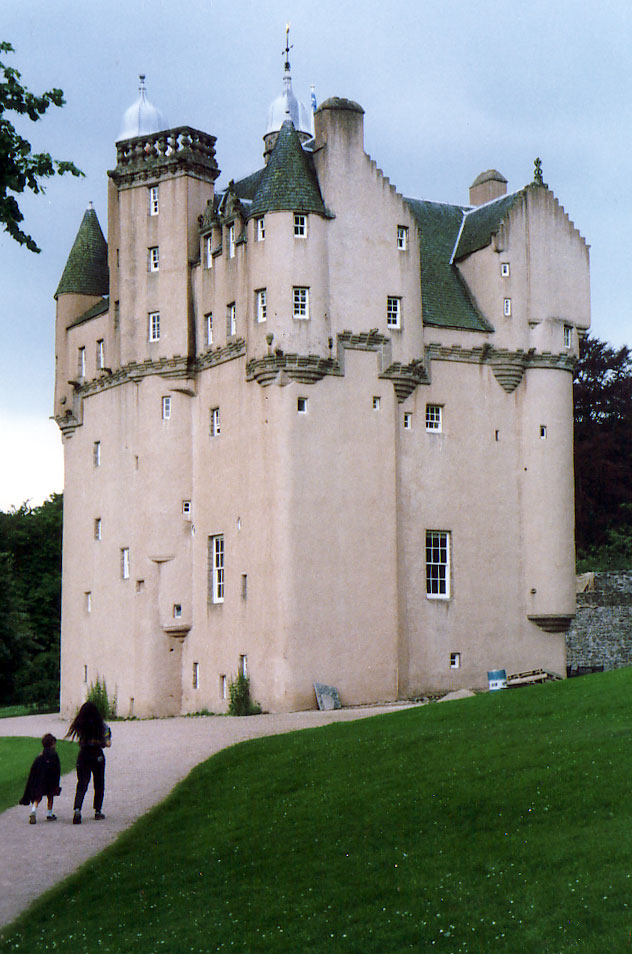
Craigievar Castle, principal seat of the Forbes family.

== Early life ==
The issue of Ewan's gender would later prove contentious; the birth registration recorded a female, but Forbes later commented that this was "a ghastly mistake". Ewan was brought up as a girl alongside Margaret, but found childhood to be dominated by a growing gender insecurity. In early childhood, his mother began to call him "Benjie", a name that persisted among family and friends well into his later life. He spent a large amount of time playing with their cousins Patrick and David, and routinely dressed as a boy. In his book The Aul' Days, written many years later, Forbes recalled a hatred of being "made to dress up" for social engagements, and of going to great lengths to avoid them.

Lord Sempill insisted on a "strict Scottish" upbringing for his children, which meant that he was taught to speak and write fluently in Doric as well as in European languages. Forbes refused to go away to a girls' school, which meant being educated at home; at fifteen, he pressed to be allowed to go overseas to attend a pre-university course, and eventually settled on a co-educational institution in Dresden. In Dresden, he and his mother first began visiting specialist doctors for a course of hormone therapy. After coming out as a debutante in London in the late 1920s, Forbes studied in Dresden for a year, 1929–1930, before travelling through central Europe, visiting Prague and Vienna. This journey provided the opportunity for a further series of visits to medical specialists for treatment. In the following academic year, he continued his studies in Paris, where he attended lectures at the Sorbonne and studied the harp under the principal harpist of the Paris Opéra.

As well as the harp, Forbes was an accomplished public reciter; in the summer of 1930, he won the Scots Verse recital contest at the Aberdeen Music Festival, and was paid by Beltona to make a series of recordings of the poems of Charles Murray. After returning from Paris, he led a troupe of Scottish country dancers, the "Dancers of Don", that he had formed together with Isabella Mitchell. The troupe was largely female, meaning that many male parts were expected to be danced by women, and Forbes embraced the opportunity to be in public in a kilt and jacket. By this time, Forbes's heart was set on studying medicine. However, his father refused to fund his studies, arguing that since there was more than enough work to be done managing the estate, there was no need for him to study further. Ewan resolved to fund his own studies, aiming to put aside £1,000 to cover the costs. In 1933, he studied under the psychologist Leonhard Seif in Munich, living with his cousin, the British novelist Phyllis Bottome. He continued his hormone treatment during this time. Whilst there, he witnessed the German elections which brought the Nazi Party into power, and heard Adolf Hitler speak.

On the death of Lord Sempill in 1934, both the barony and the baronetcy passed to William, the eldest child. Forbes inherited an estate at Brux Castle, Aberdeenshire, of about 1,300 acres (5.3 km^{2}), and enthusiastically took to the lifestyle of a laird, adopting a broad Doric accent and taking to wearing a masculine kilt. He avoided upper-class society, where female clothing would be expected, and the last time he publicly appeared in a dress was to escort his mother to a royal garden party in 1935.

== Medical career ==
In 1939, Forbes was accepted as a medical student at the University of Aberdeen. He graduated in 1944 and took up the post of Junior Casualty Officer at the Aberdeen Royal Infirmary. After a swift progression to Senior Casualty Officer, he began to work as a general practitioner in Alford, Aberdeenshire in 1945. In addition to the normal work of a rural doctor, in 1946 Forbes was called upon to act as a medical officer for German prisoners of war who were held in the area, due to his command of the language.

The Alford area was one of the largest medical practices in Great Britain, and in the winter months Forbes often had to travel through ten-foot (3.0 m) snowdrifts in a converted Universal Carrier. These conditions were not entirely unfamiliar; a trip to see an uncle in St. Moritz at the age of thirteen had led to him taking up skiing and figure-skating and winning a number of bob sled races. He did not live in Alford, but remained at Brux, appointing a medical assistant to live in the town. The estate, left in the hands of a small resident staff, quickly ran into financial troubles. To raise a large amount of money quickly, Forbes sold the practice in Alford and returned to the farm in 1952, running it directly as a going concern from then on.

On moving to Alford, Forbes had continued to present himself publicly as a man. In 1952, he formally became male by the simple process of requesting a warrant for birth re-registration from the Sheriff of Aberdeen, registering himself as male, and changing his name to Ewan Forbes-Sempill. He announced this with a notice in the Aberdeen Press and Journal of 12 September 1952: "Dr E. Forbes-Sempill henceforth wishes to be known as Dr Ewan Forbes-Sempill". His plans had been known in advance to many of his patients, who were reported as universally supportive. Forbes was equally candid with the press, describing the situation to one reporter as "a ghastly mistake. I was carelessly registered as a girl in the first place, but of course, that was forty years ago ... the doctors in those days were mistaken, too ... I have been sacrificed to prudery, and the horror which our parents had about sex."

A month later, on 10 October, he married Isabella Mitchell, his housekeeper for the past five years, and formerly co-founder of his dance troupe. The marriage took place at the kirk in Kildrummy, which he had recently joined.

== Inheritance and lawsuit ==
The re-registration passed without much public comment, and the issue of his gender would remain a private one until 1965. That December, his elder brother died, leaving daughters but no sons, and thus posing a problem of inheritance. The barony could be inherited by heirs male or female, and so passed directly to Sempill's eldest daughter Ann, but the baronetcy – along with the bulk of the land – would have to pass to the first male heir. The family had assumed that Ewan would inherit, as the younger brother. Following the death of the Lord Sempill in December 1965, The Times cited Debrett's in reporting that the heir to the baronetcy was the Hon. Ewan Forbes-Sempill, "formerly registered as Elizabeth". However, this was challenged by his cousin John Forbes-Sempill, who argued that the 1952 re-registration was invalid. This would mean that Forbes was still legally considered a woman, unable to inherit the title, and so it would pass to John Forbes-Sempill.

At the time, gender re-registration was permitted in a limited set of cases; the leading case, decided in 1965, had held that re-registration of this form was only permitted when "the sex of a child was indeterminate at birth and it was later discovered ... that an error had been made". The challenge was taken to the Court of Session, where the case was heard in great secrecy by a single judge, Lord Hunter – no papers were publicly filed, and the judge sat in a solicitor's office rather than in open court to hear the case. A total of twelve medical experts were called to give evidence. Among the experts, Professor Martin Roth observed in evidence that he felt Forbes' condition was closer to that of a transsexual, and Professor John Strong described the medical tests involved as "not wholly conclusive". Professor Louis Gooren returned to his records of the case in 1999 and "concluded, with hindsight, that Forbes-Sempill was almost certainly a female-to-male transsexual"; the details that have since emerged of his treatment make it clear that he was a trans man.

The judge's ruling was that "as a matter of probability, the second petitioner [Ewan Forbes-Sempill] is a ... hermaphrodite", according with the legal requirement of "indeterminate at birth". It has been suggested that the judge desired to ensure the estate and the title was inherited by the "right" candidate, and was flexible with his judgment to obtain this result. The ruling continued to be challenged by John Forbes-Sempill, who caused it to be referred to the Home Secretary, James Callaghan, as the person responsible for the Roll of the Baronetage. Callaghan consulted the Lord Advocate, and finally declared in December 1968 that Ewan should be entered on the Roll as the rightful holder of the title.

The level of secrecy of the case, which was criticised by some contemporary observers, meant that it was not properly recorded or published, and the exact facts of the argument were not known for some time. As a result, whilst it sharply differs from later rulings such as Corbett v Corbett (1970), it was not able to be considered as precedent in later judgments on the legal recognition of gender variance. The records of the case were finally made available via the National Archives of Scotland in 1991, with additional documents released in 1994 after an appeal to the Home Secretary. However, further release of records was limited, with the Lord Advocate's office stating that disclosing the files "would not be appropriate", and the case would not be fully publicly documented until 2021.

== Later life ==
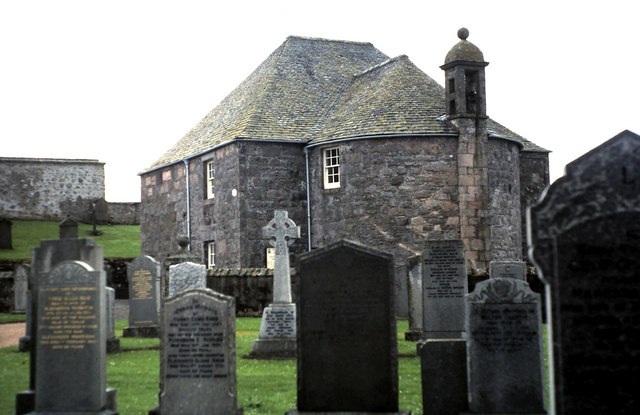
The kirk in Kildrummy, where Forbes was an elder.

On taking up the baronetcy, Forbes dropped Sempill from his surname; this had been adopted by the family in the 1880s when it inherited the barony, and there was no reason to persist once the titles were separated.

With the inheritance case settled, he left the public eye and returned to the life of a rural landowner, continuing to live in his house at Brux. Forbes was an elder of the local kirk at Kildrummy, and was appointed a Justice of the Peace for Aberdeenshire in 1969. He published a book of reminiscences of his early years in 1984, The Aul' Days.

Forbes died in 1991, leaving no children, and was succeeded in the baronetcy by his cousin John, the relative who had made the legal challenge in the 1960s. His widow, Isabella, died in 2002.

== Legacy ==
In 2021, Zoë Playdon published a book about Forbes, The Hidden Case of Ewan Forbes: And the Unwritten History of the Trans Experience. As of 2021, Playdon's book was in early development as a television miniseries.

== Coat of arms ==
Coat of arms of Sir Ewan Forbes, 11th Baronet
Crest A cock proper. Escutcheon Azure, a cross patée fitchee or between three bear’s heads couped argent, muzzled gules. Supporters Dexter: A knight in armour of the fifteenth century, armed at all points, leaving the beaver of his helmet up and leaning on a shield or, charged with a lion rampant gules armed and langued azure within a double tressure flowered and counterflowered with fleurs-de-lis of the second; Sinister, a bear argent, muzzled gules. Motto Watch

== Notes ==
Baronetage of Nova Scotia
Preceded by William Forbes-Sempill	Baronet of Craigievar; 1965–1991	Succeeded by John Forbes
