= Discrimination against transgender men =

Discrimination against transgender men and transmasculine individuals, sometimes referred to as anti-transmasculinity, transandrophobia, or transmisandry, is a form of transphobia targeting a trans individual's acquired masculinity.

== Terminology ==
The discrimination experienced by transgender men has been described using various words, but none have seen widespread use. Terms typically used include anti-transmasculinity and transandrophobia. The rare term transmisandry is also used, though much less frequently than the term for prejudice against trans women, transmisogyny.

Julia Serano, who coined transmisogyny in 2007, commented in 2021 that "misogyny may intersect with transphobia in different ways" for transgender men as opposed to transgender women, which "doesn't necessarily make [the term] transmisogyny 'wrong'; it may simply mean that we need additional language."

== Instances ==
=== Lack of visibility ===
Transgender men historically did not enjoy much visibility due to lack of awareness that female-to-male (FTM) transition existed. Historian Susan Stryker notes that though Reed Erickson, a wealthy trans man, funded much of the inchoate, "often-confusing maze" of medical providers in the United States treating trans people, they tended not to be focused on the needs of trans men. In 1968, Mario Martino founded Labyrinth, the first counselling organisation exclusively concerned with the care of trans men, to help other trans men navigate the process of medical and social transition through these providers.

==== Erasure ====
The relative invisibility of transgender men and transmasculine people in society is sometimes ascribed to erasure. Jamison Green, an American transgender man and activist, recalled in his memoir that ahead of presentations given by him, audiences were told a transsexual would be speaking. When Green walked into the room, they were visibly disappointed, assuming that the transsexual person had not showed up. Green also writes of panels that were convened to discuss the needs of transgender men that were instead spent by explaining to the audience what transgender men were.

In some legal cases involving trans men, including the 1965 primogeniture case involving Ewan Forbes, judgements have been sealed or otherwise not been properly recorded or published, preventing subsequent legal cases from drawing upon the precedents set in these cases. In her 2021 book about Ewan Forbes' case, Zoe Playdon writes that due to the strict secrecy and subsequent erasure of the case, transgender acceptance in the United Kingdom was delayed for the next 50 years.

=== Sexual violence ===
Whether or not transgender men and transmasculine people are at a high risk for sexual assault, sexual violence and rape is unclear. The 2015 U.S. Transgender Survey found that 51% of trans men reported being sexually assaulted at least once in their lives. However a study published by the American Journal of Public Health found that trans men and women are at a higher risk of sexual abuse but that there was no increased risk between men and women. A separate analysis showed that trans women faced higher rates of sexual violence.

In 2019 (conducted in 2018), Counting Ourselves, an anonymous health survey of transgender individuals in New Zealand reported that since the age of thirteen, 50% of surveyed trans men have experienced attempted rape, and 33% were made to have sex against their will. 40% have been forced, or have experienced an attempt to be forced, to have sexual intercourse when they did not want to.

A survey conducted by the National Center for Transgender Equality showed 51% of surveyed trans men had been sexually assaulted at some point in their life, compared to the 47% of all trans and gender diverse participants. Another U.S. study showed 43% of transgender men (compared to 24% of transgender women) had experienced past year physical violence, with an even greater difference of 42% and 14% when only counting sexual violence.

Despite transgender men and transmasculine people's high rates of sexual assault victimization compared to the general population, many rape and sexual assault crisis centres are not open to men, cis or trans, leading to transmasculine people being put at risk of not having any resources after a sexually motivated crime. In 2023, the ARC Readiness Assessment of providers in New Zealand found that only 29% of those surveyed knew of safe sexual assault recovery or family violence services to refer trans men to, whereas 37% knew safe sources for trans women and 44% knew safe sources for non-binary people. The ARC Readiness report also stated that this knowledge of safe services was "not based on training or knowledge about safety of services for transgender or intersex people."

=== Bathroom access ===
Some sources show that trans men have increased issues with safely accessing bathrooms aligned with their gender identity as compared to the overall trans population. one survey reported that 16% of transgender male participants had been verbally harassed in public bathrooms, compared to 9% for all participants. 29% of trans men and boys have been told or asked if they were using the wrong bathroom, which includes 42% of younger trans men, and 49% have avoided using public bathrooms altogether.

In 2025 (conducted in 2022), the same survey found that 56% of transgender men and boys in Aotearoa have been told or asked if they were using the wrong bathroom. 53% were found to have avoided going to the bathroom because of fear of having problems stemming from their trans identities.

=== Misgendering ===
Transgender men's experience of misgendering—being referred to or categorised with a gender they do not identify with—may vary from receiving verbal insults to experiencing physical assault. Increased rates of misgendering are positively associated with psychological distress among transgender people, including gender dysphoria and anxiety. A 2009 study of transgender men in the San Francisco Bay Area interviewed nineteen trans men on their experiences post-transition. The study reported that nearly all interviewees "claimed that their fear of violence or harassment stemmed from the worry that other men would react violently if they judged the interviewees' masculine practices as effeminate or not appropriately masculine". Even when others generally read them as male, trans men interviewed reported a need to defend their masculinity or carefully avoid conflict to prevent violence from male peers after transition.

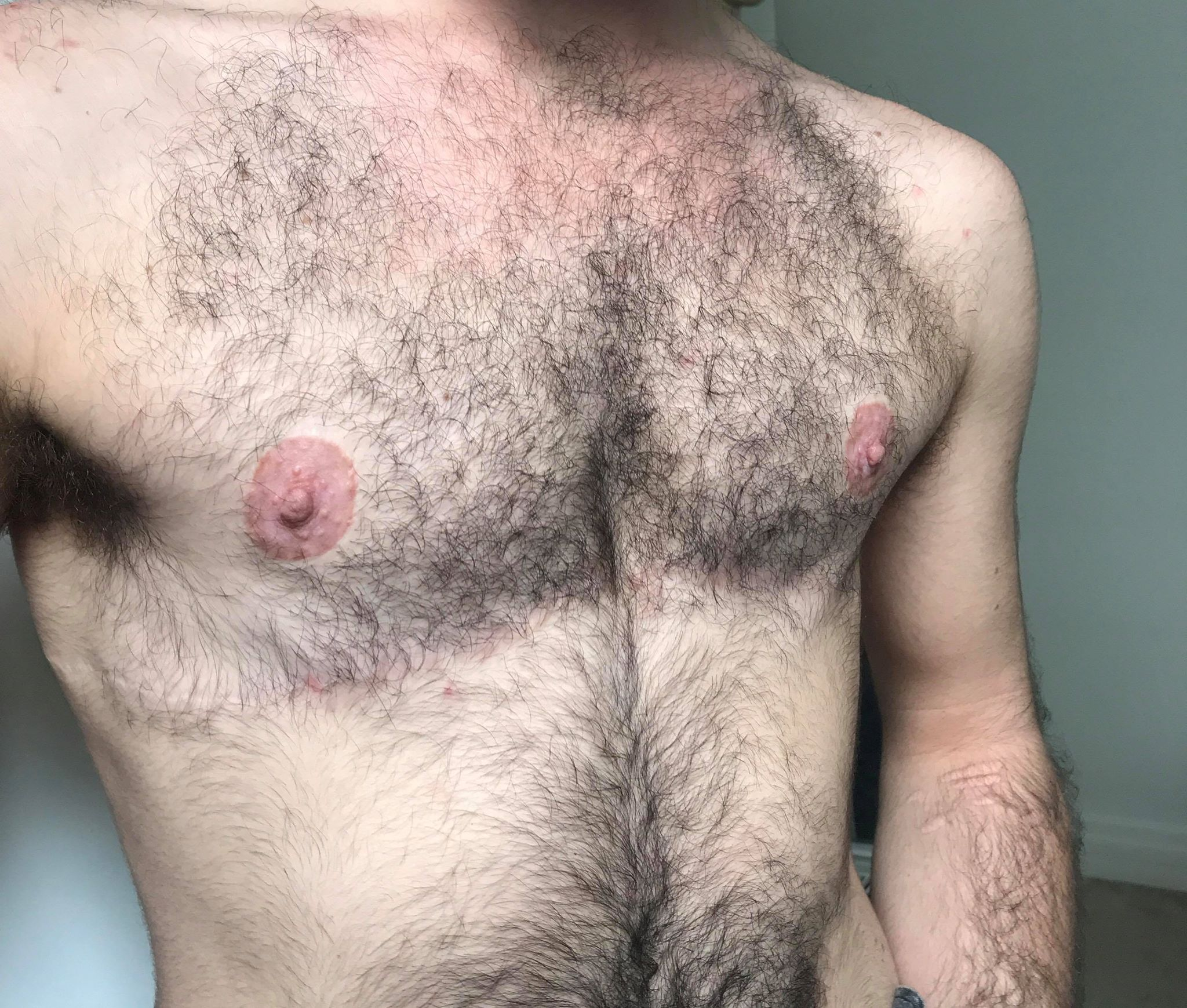
Healed double mastectomy (top surgery) scars on a transgender man. Many transgender men undergo gender-affirming surgery to alleviate gender dysphoria.

=== In relation to racism ===
Trans men and transmasculine people of colour face a unique discrimination as a result of their race, gender and transgender status intersecting. An interviewee for the project To Survive on this Shore discusses racism against black trans men:

"In the beginning, when I started transitioning, when my features started changing, when it got to the point where I was totally male, I wondered why people were treating me differently. Other races were treating me differently. And I realized, I'm a black male now, and so when I step on the elevator, the woman's going to clutch her pocketbook, or she's going to move to the other side of the elevator, or I get doors slammed in my face."

— Charley, 2014

Citing Krell, Martino and Omercajic explain that "'racialized transmisandry' helps to explain the policing around Black masculinity for Black transmasculine persons [who] have been effaced in a white-centric and classed framing of cisgenderism and cissexism."

=== In feminist and lesbian circles ===
Bradbury-Rance and scholars such as Jack Halberstam connect transphobic hostility towards trans men in feminist and lesbian circles with their rejection of butch lesbians (lesbians who exhibit a masculine gender identity or presentation). Some trans men were formerly involved in lesbian communities; in the 1970s, growing suspicion towards butch-femme identity from radical feminist circles contributed to a perception of butch identities as "patriarchal gender" which marginalized those with masculine presentations.

==== Butch flight ====
Transgender men may be accused of "butch-flight", which claims that butch lesbians who later come out as transgender men are in some way being tricked into transitioning instead of remaining as butch lesbians. As the name "butch flight" implies, transgender men who formerly identified as butch lesbians are viewed as having left the lesbian community en masse. Notably, this perception of transgender men became more visible starting in the 1970s, and peaking in the 1990s, when transgender issues in general were becoming more visible. Transgender men were enabled to come out, leading to a perception that there was a "flight" from the butch lesbian community as increasing amounts of transgender men felt able to pursue transition. S. Bear Bergman, an American transgender man and author, touched on "butch flight" in his 2006 book Butch is a Noun:

"I hear from butches that they are saddened by what they think of as Butch Flight, that people who once might have lived as butches are now living as men, and it makes them sad. They want back the visibly queer phalanx of butches, and they want the kickass women butches sometimes embodied. Feminism, they insist, is not being helped by the fact of women with masculine qualities decamping from Women's Space to the Old Boys Network".

==== Radical feminism ====
In The Transsexual Empire (1979) radical feminist author and activist Janice Raymond denounces transsexuality. Raymond's focus is overwhelmingly on trans women (whom she misgenders as men), however, some parts of the book discuss trans men (whom she misgenders as women). Raymond argues:

The female-to-constructed-male transsexual is the token that saves face for the male “transsexual empire”. She is the buffer zone who can be used to promote the universalist argument that transsexualism is a supposed “human” problem

— Janice Raymond, The Transsexual Empire, page 27

According to Mimi Marinucci, gender essentialism and sex essentialism are radical feminist views on gender. She argues that gender essentialism in radical feminism demonizes masculinity and maleness as a whole, targeting trans women for their assigned sex at birth and targeting trans men for their transition into manhood. Masculinizing procedures are sometimes called "mutilating surgery" by radical feminists.

=== Medical marginalisation ===
Trans men and transmasculine people face discrimination in certain medical contexts. This may include difficulty in accessing cervical smears where transmasculine individuals are subjected to misgendering that cisgender women do not generally experience, due to transgender men having gender identities that are often considered incongruent with the gendered medical care they require. Alongside misgendering, transgender men may experience transphobia as a result of not being read as men in a medical setting. The pap smear test is more likely to be inadequate in detecting cervical cancer in transgender men who use masculinizing hormone therapy.

Trans men and transmasculine people are frequently the subjects of medical marginalization, with 42% of surveyed trans men in the U.S. reporting negative experiences with healthcare providers. There is a lack of credible research about how to provide adequate healthcare to transgender men undergoing medical transition, notably with doctors having difficulty diagnosing breast cancer in people who have undergone top surgery. Transmasculine people are also at an increased risk for experiencing discrimination in medicine that may impact their access to healthcare. This can include transmasculine people with cervixes not being invited for life-saving cervical screenings because their gender is legally listed as male or being denied screenings for ovarian cancer for the same reason.

Impacted trans men and transmasculine people are sometimes omitted from discussions about reproductive rights, menstruation, and bodily autonomy because they are seen exclusively as "women's issues". This includes healthcare professionals neglecting to discuss contraception to prevent unwanted transgender pregnancy.

Transmasculine people with uteruses, who choose to retain them, may be able to become pregnant, but may also face additional barriers to abortion services. In 2018, proposed legislation to legalize abortion in Ireland only mentioned women in the context of obtaining abortion. Campaign groups feared for the potential implications for transgender men, believing and stating that "the proposed legislation for termination of pregnancy in Ireland will only allow women to access abortion" and "thus, trans men in Ireland will be denied abortion access".

Transmasculine people who willingly seek out pregnancy may regardless experience misgendering within the medical industry, and— even if visually passing— are unable to completely go stealth. Some transgender men are forced to pause or reverse their transitions for the course of their pregnancies for the sake of their safeties, and possibly experience gender dysphoria because of this.

Between 2009 and 2014, trans men accounted for 11% of HIV-positive transgender individuals in the U.S., with 60% of them being virally suppressed for at least one year. This study conducted by the American Public Health Association states that "transgender men who have sex with men are at increased risk for HIV acquisition and [...] constitute 15.4% of the newly diagnosed HIV cases among transgender persons. Transgender men are an understudied population lacking evidence-based HIV interventions to address their needs." The majority of PrEP medications, such as Descovy, that are meant to prevent contraction of HIV have not been tested for people who were assigned female at birth. 47% of HIV-positive trans men in the U.S. between 2009 and 2014 and 40% of HIV-positive trans men in the U.S. in 2018 were black. Omission from medical research leaves trans men vulnerable to illnesses, STDs, and malpractice.

== Mental health impacts ==
Transmasculine people face social abuse, including bullying and harassment. Stigma and negative attitudes towards transmasculine people's manhoods contribute to widespread mental health problems in the community.

=== Suicide risk ===
According to a 2018 study, 50.8% of transgender boys (ages 11–19) have attempted suicide. In addition, a 2013 study on transgender men's sexual health suggested that trans men's psychosocial health vulnerabilities may contribute to sexual risk behaviours and HIV and STD vulnerability. Remembering Our Dead is a website which collects reports of transgender people lost to violence, reports on transgender men who have lost their lives to suicide.

== Notable cases ==
=== Ewan Forbes' primogeniture challenge ===
Ewan Forbes was a Scottish trans man and doctor, who in 1965 was challenged to his right to inherit his father's baronetcy by his cousin, through the means of invasive medical testing involving Forbes' body. He won the baronetcy after a court case conducted under strict secrecy; the ruling was not properly recorded or published, which prevented British transgender law from drawing upon it as precedent. Zoe Playdon wrote that secrecy around the case was due in part to discrimination against transgender men and ultimately had the effect of delaying transgender acceptance in the United Kingdom for the next 50 years.

In December 1965, Forbes' older brother William Forbes-Sempill (19th Lord Sempill and 10th Baronet Craigievar) died, leaving open the question of who would inherit the baronetcy. Baronies may be passed to a daughter or a son and therefore passed without issue to Forbes-Sempill's eldest daughter, Ann. The baronetcy of Craigievar could only be passed to a male relative, and since Forbes was legally male, he would have been next in the line of succession. However, Forbes' cousin John Forbes-Sempill challenged his right to the baronetcy on the grounds that he had been registered as female on his birth certificate and therefore could not be a male heir.

At this time, it was only possible to re-register a birth in the United Kingdom in a limited number of circumstances. One of these circumstances permitted a birth certificate to be re-registered if the sex of a child was indeterminate at birth and it was later discovered an error had been made when registering the sex of the child, i.e., the child was born intersex, but this was not discovered until a later date. Forbes is generally now understood to be a non-intersex transgender man; he had been socially and medically transitioning for many years. Forbes had his birth re-registered in 1952 and formally changed his name to Ewan. That same year he married Isabella Mitchell at Brux Lodge. He last appeared in public wearing a dress in 1935.

His cousin's legal challenge threatened to impact Forbes' life in several ways. A loss for Forbes in court would have meant the dissolution of his marriage (if he had been declared female instead of male, his marriage would have been considered same-sex, which was illegal at that time) as well as gravely impacting his medical career and social standing. The case was heard in secrecy at the Court of Session and heard by a single judge (Lord Hunter) with twelve medical experts invited to give evidence. Several of the experts believed that the tests were inconclusive, while some believed that Forbes' condition was closer to that of a female-to-male transsexual. However, Forbes' profession as a doctor enabled him to procure a sample of testicular tissue (of unknown provenance), which he then presented as his own to the court. The judge ruled that, based on the case presented by Forbes, he was intersex as a matter of probability. As a result of this ruling, Forbes was able to inherit the baronetcy of Craigievar in December 1968.

=== Lou Sullivan's campaign ===
Lou Sullivan was an American gay transgender man who was repeatedly denied access to gender-affirming surgery based on his identity as a gay trans man from 1975 onward. This was due to the expectation at the time that transgender people should conform to heteronormative relationships in their acquired gender. Sullivan's experiences prompted him to start a campaign against the inclusion of homosexuality as a contraindication for gender-affirming surgery.

In 1976, Sullivan was rejected from a gender dysphoria program at Stanford University due to his identity as a gay trans man. This experience led to a brief re-closeting lasting three years. However, in 1979, he was able to access hormone replacement therapy and then gender-affirming surgery from sympathetic doctors at the Institute for Advanced Study of Human Sexuality, who accepted his sexuality.

In 1986, Sullivan was diagnosed with HIV and told he only had 10 months to live. It is believed that Sullivan was the first known case of a transgender man contracting AIDS. Sullivan was a keen diarist and wrote with regards to his rejection from the Stanford program, saying "I took a certain pleasure in informing the gender clinic that even though their program told me I could not live as a Gay man, it looks like I'm going to die like one." He died from AIDS-related complications in 1991.

=== Assault and murder of Brandon Teena ===
Brandon Teena was a trans man who was raped and murdered in December 1993 in Humboldt, Nebraska. His death, alongside two of his friends, Phillip DeVine and Lisa Lambert, is thought to be a hate crime motivated by his status as a transgender man. His murderers, Marvin Nissen and John Lotter, forced Teena to remove his trousers at a Christmas party to prove to Teena's partner that he had a vulva. Nissen and Lotter then forced Teena into a car and drove to a meat packing plant in Richardson County, where they beat and raped him. They then took him to Nissen's home and forced him to shower. Teena escaped from the bathroom window and sought refuge at Tisdel's house. Tisdel convinced Teena to file a report to the police despite Teena's fear of reprisals, as Nissen and Lotter had threatened they would "silence him permanently" if he did.

A rape kit was administered to Teena after he sought care at a local hospital, but it was subsequently lost. Later, Sheriff Charles B. Laux, focused in his interview on Teena's status as a transgender man, and Teena refused to answer some questions, finding them "rude and unnecessary". Nissen and Lotter learned of Teena's police report and began to search for him. Before they found him however, they were taken in for questioning. However, Sheriff Laux refused to arrest them, stating, "What kind of a person was she? The first few times we arrested her, she was putting herself off as a guy." in defence of his refusal to arrest Nissen and Lotter.

On 31 December 1993, Nissen and Lotter broke into the home of Lisa Lambert, where Teena was hiding. They subsequently killed every adult in the house, including Teena, Lambert and Phillip DeVine.

Teena is buried in Lincoln Memorial Cemetery, in Lincoln, Nebraska.

==== Media coverage ====
The media coverage of Teena's death is somewhat controversial. Some scholars have pointed out the inaccuracies of subsequent film adaptations of the events leading up to Teena's murder in 1993. Televised coverage also drew criticism, after Saturday Night Live cast member Norm MacDonald remarked "Now, this might strike some viewers as harsh, but I believe everyone involved in this story should die." during the program's 400th episode broadcast on 24 February 1996. This was received negatively by many in the trans community and the lesbian community, who viewed the comments as inflammatory towards transmasculine people.

=== Robert Eads' medical discrimination ===
Robert Eads was a transgender man born in 1945 who transitioned later in life, and was advised not to seek a hysterectomy or oophorectomy. After experiencing severe abdominal pain and seeking emergency medical care in 1996, he was diagnosed with ovarian cancer. Despite his diagnosis, more than 20 doctors refused to treat his cancer on the grounds that treating a transgender person would hurt the reputation of their practice. By the time he was finally accepted for treatment at the Medical College of Georgia in 1997, the cancer had metastasised to other parts of his body, leading to his death in 1999 at the age of 54. The final year of his life became the subject of the documentary Southern Comfort (2001).

=== Abuse of transmasculine people at Louisiana ICE facility ===
Between 2023 and 2025, three transmasculine people (Mario Garcia-Valenzuela, Kenia Campos-Flores, and Monica Renteria-Gonzales) and one anonymous queer cisgender woman (identified only as Jane Doe) were subject to abuses including forced labor, sexual assault, denial of medical care, and solitary confinement while detained at the South Louisiana ICE Processing Center in Basile, Louisiana. A complaint filed with the United States Department of Homeland Security alleges that former assistant warden Manuel Reyes approached the detainees separately to recruit them for an "unsanctioned, late-night forced labor scheme that targeted transgender and gender non-conforming detained people".

In this work program, the detainees claim to have been forced to move heavy cabinets and cinder blocks, and use industrial-strength cleaning chemicals without protective equipment. When this work resulted in injuries, Reyes taunted them, saying such things as "Aren't you a man? Can't you do manly work?" They were paid less than $5USD a day for this work. Detainees were repeatedly sexually assaulted, stalked, and harassed. In retaliation for speaking out, they were denied medical care and medication, and placed in solitary confinement.

== See also ==
- Misandry
- Transphobia
- Transmisogyny
- Violence against men
- Transgender rights movement
- Sexual assault of LGBTQ people
- Fetishization of LGBTQ people
- Violence against transgender people
