= Isabella Forbes =

British aristocrat

Lady Forbes of Craigievar
- Born: Isabella Mitchell; 1913; Glenrinnes, Banffshire, Scotland, United Kingdom
- Died: 2002 (aged 88–89); Aberlour, Scotland, United Kingdom
- Occupations: Housekeeper, farmer, landlady and dancer
- Spouse: Sir Ewan Forbes, 11th Baronet
- Parent: Alexander Mitchell (father)

Isabella Forbes, Lady Forbes of Craigievar (née Mitchell; 1913 – 2002) was a British aristocrat, farmer, dancer, and domestic worker. She was the wife of Sir Ewan Forbes, 11th Baronet, a transgender man who won a court case allowing his succession to the Forbes baronetecy. A talented Scottish country dancer, she co-founded the Dancers of Don, a dance troupe that specialized in country and highland dances.

== Biography ==
Lady Forbes was born Isabella Mitchell in 1913 on her family's farm in Glenrinnes, Banffshire. She was the daughter of Alexander Mitchell, a farmer. Lady Forbes was known by friends and family as "Patty".

Upon completing her education, she worked as a housekeeper for the doctor and farmer Ewan Forbes-Sempill. She was his housekeeper for five years. The two became friends, with their shared interest of music and dance, and co-founded the Dancers of Don, a group that specialised in Scottish country dances.

On 10 October 1952, she married Forbes-Sempill in a small ceremony at the local church in Kildrummy. Their reception was held at their residence, Brux Lodge. Her husband was a transgender man. Despite being considered an ill-match due to their differing social classes, their marriage was a happy one. She was not accepted into the social circles of the Aberdeenshire landed gentry and upon hearing a woman say that "Sir Ewan's wife" was "not one of our kind", she reportedly retorted, "No, I'm not and thank God for it!"

In 1965, on the death of Forbes-Sempill's brother, William Forbes-Sempill, 19th Lord Sempill, 11th Baronet Forbes of Craigievar, her husband stood to claim the Forbes baronetcy. His first cousin, John Alexander Cumnock Forbes-Sempill, son of Rear Admiral Arthur Forbes-Semphill, challenged the succession on the grounds that the baronetecy could only be passed to a male heir. A case was made before the Court of Session, which ruled that her husband was rightfully the baronet. John Forbes-Sempill challenged the ruling, and the case was brought before the Home Secretary, James Callaghan. Callaghan ruled that Ewan Forbes, as he was then known, to be entered into the Roll of Baronets as the 11th Forbes baronet. Upon her husband's succession to the title, she became styled as Lady Forbes of Craigievar. Her husband recognized that Lady Forbes had been a source of strength for him throughout the legal battle and dedicated his book The Aul' Days to her, writing "my wife who has taken such an interest in all the country lore and been my help at all times."

In 1955, Lady Forbes' husband gave up his medical practice, and the two devoted themselves to farming their 1,300 acre estate at Brux Castle.

She was widowed in 1991. Lady Forbes died on 17 February 2002 at Aberlour.
