= John Forbes-Sempill, 18th Lord Sempill =

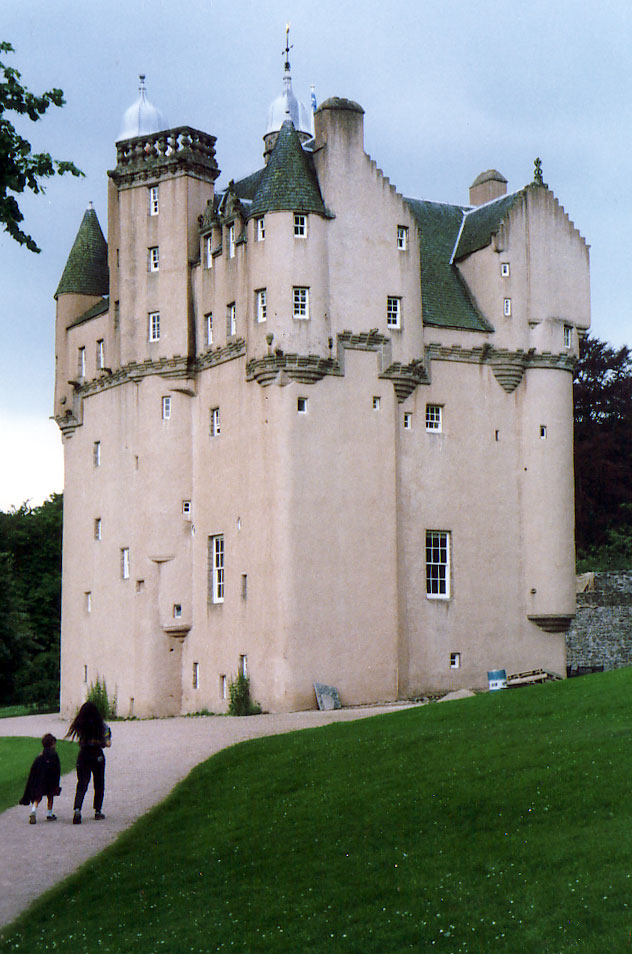
Craigievar Castle, home of the Forbes family

John Forbes-Sempill, 18th Lord Sempill (21 August 1863 – 28 February 1934) was a Scottish peer, the 18th Lord Sempill and 9th Baronet of Craigievar.

== Life ==
He was the son of William Forbes-Sempill, 17th Lord Sempill, and Frances Emily Abercromby, the daughter of Sir Robert Abercromby, 5th Baronet, and succeeded to the titles on the death of his father in 1905, prior to which he was known by the courtesy title "Master of Sempill". In addition to two sisters, he was the eldest of five brothers, four of whom served in the military; Douglas, a Major in the Seaforth Highlanders, was killed on the North-West Frontier of India in 1908, whilst Robert, a Lieutenant with the Gordon Highlanders, was killed near Festubert in northern France during the Great War. The youngest of the four, Arthur, served with the Royal Navy and survived the Battle of Jutland. A fifth brother, William, died in infancy.

After studying at Eton, he joined the 3rd (Militia) Battalion of the Gordon Highlanders in 1883, then transferred to the Queen's Own Cameron Highlanders in 1885. After service in the Sudan, he transferred to the Army Service Corps in 1894, then transferred into the Black Watch in 1894. He served with the Lovat Scouts and then the Black Watch in the Second Boer War, where he was an adjutant of volunteers from his regiment. He left South Africa after the end of the war, in late July 1902, and returned to his regiment in January 1903. He would later go on to command the 8th Battalion Black Watch in the First World War, where he was severely wounded at the Battle of Loos and mentioned in despatches. Colonel Lord Sempill was badly wounded near Fosse No.8, and lay, his legs paralysed, until bearers were able to carry him back. His orderly, Corporal W. Smith service number 3/3133, lay all day in the open with him, and assisted in carrying him in at dusk. He later claimed to have been the first man from Kitchener's Army to land in France; he had leapt ashore before the troopship had tied up at the dock. He later served in the House of Lords as a Scottish representative peer, and was later the chairman of the Aberdeenshire Territorial Army Association, the Honorary Colonel of the 5th Battalion Gordon Highlanders - his brother Robert's battalion - and an aide-de-camp to King George V. He was buried at the Forbes of Fintray burial vault, St Meddan's Church, Aberdeenshire.

== Family ==
His wife, Gwendolyn Prodger, was born and raised in Wales, with a Cornish mother, and was an accomplished harpist. The two had met at the fashionable resort of Homburg in the 1880s, and were married on 22 June 1892.

They had four children; the eldest, William, who led a trade mission to Japan and subsequently released British aviation secrets to the Japanese, succeeded to his father's titles. The baronetcy would later pass to their younger son, Ewan, on William's death, whilst the barony passed to their granddaughter Ann. In addition to the sons, they had two daughters; Gwendolyn (also known as Gwyneth), who died of appendicitis aged twelve, and Margaret, who later became a Justice of the Peace and a decorated member of the Women's Auxiliary Air Force in the Second World War.

His sister Katherine married the naturalist George Muirhead FRSE in 1907.

== Coat of arms ==
Coat of arms of John Forbes-Sempill, 18th Lord Sempill
Coronet A coronet of a Baron Crest 1st, a stag’s head argent, attired with ten tynes azure, collared with a prince’s crown or; 2nd, A cock proper. Escutcheon Quarterly: 1st and 4th argent, a chevron cheeky gules and of the field, between three hunting horns sable, garnished and stringed of the second, (Sempill); 2nd and 4rd azure, a cross patée fitchée or, between three bear’s heads couped argent, muzzled gules, (Forbes of Craigievar). Supporters Two greyhounds argent, collared gules. Motto 1st Keep Tryst; 2nd Watch.

== Notes ==
Peerage of Scotland
Preceded by William Forbes-Sempill	Lord Sempill; 1905–1934	Succeeded by William Francis Forbes-Sempill
Baronetage of Nova Scotia
Preceded by William Forbes-Sempill	Baronet (of Craigievar); 1905–1934	Succeeded by William Francis Forbes-Sempill
