= Arthur Forbes-Sempill =

Rear-Admiral Arthur Lionel Ochoncar Forbes-Sempill (24 September 1877– 9 May 1962) was a Scottish officer of the Royal Navy active in the First World War.

== Biography ==
Arthur was the fourth son and youngest child of William Forbes-Sempill, 17th Lord Sempill and Frances Emily Abercromby, daughter of Sir Robert Abercromby (or his father Sir George Abercromby). His three elder brothers, John, Douglas and Robert, all served in the Army.

In January 1898, he was assigned to HMS Centurion as a sub-lieutenant, promoted to lieutenant on 30 June of the following year, and then assigned to HMS Victorious. In 1900 he was assigned to HMS Vernon for torpedo training, and in June 1902 he was re-posted to the school, before he the following month was posted as torpedo officer to the battleship HMS Empress of India, serving in the Home Fleet. In January 1903 he was posted to HMS Royal Arthur, in December 1903 he was posted to HMS Euryalus, in May 1906 to HMS Edgar, in September 1908 to HMS Bacchante, and in May 1910 to HMS King Alfred. He was then promoted Commander, and assigned to HMS Albemarle in 1911.

== First World War ==
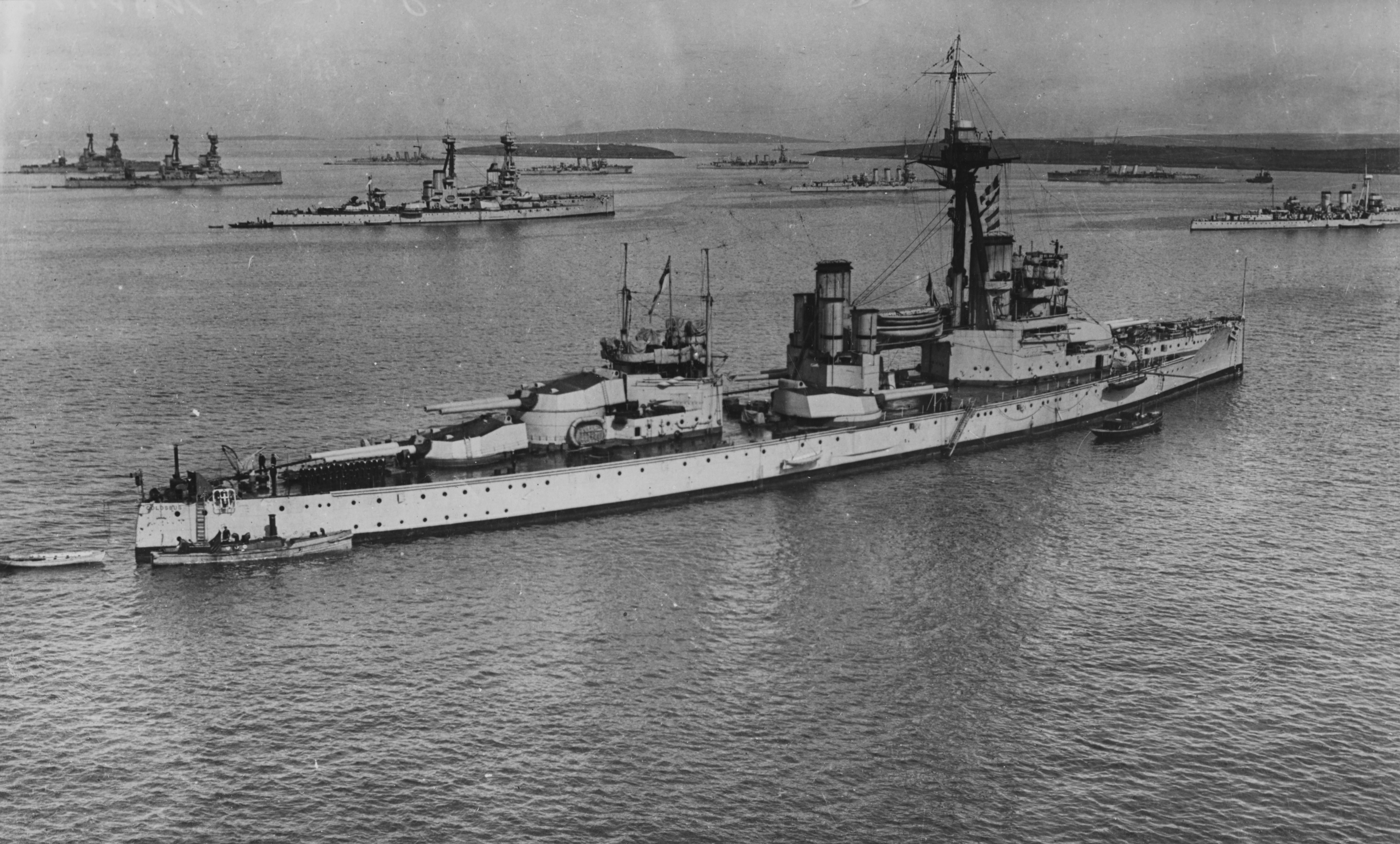
HMS Colossus

In July 1914 he was assigned to HMS Dominion, in which he served during the early part of the First World War. He was later posted as executive officer of the battleship HMS Valiant, where he saw service at the Battle of Jutland, and was recommended for promotion to Captain as a result. He later commanded the cruisers HMS Blonde and HMS Cordelia, and was present in the latter at the surrender of the German navy in 1918. By 1919, he was in command of HMS Colossus.

== Personal life ==
He married Muriel Emily ("Molly") Spencer in 1903 (daughter of The Rev. Walter Spencer and sister of Margery Greenwood, Viscountess Greenwood), and was divorced in July 1914, on the grounds of adultery; the case was not defended. His ex-wife remarried Wilfrid Ashley, 1st Baron Mount Temple. He remarried in 1919, to Helen Mabel Allen, daughter of Major John Allen, of Brackley House; she died shortly thereafter, in 1921. He remarried for a third time in 1926, to Mary Holland, an American. He had one daughter from his second marriage, Janet, and one son by his third marriage, John Alexander, who would later inherit the baronetcy held by Arthur's father, after it had passed through his elder brother John and his nephews William and then Ewan.

He died at his home in Wigtownshire on 9 May 1962.
