= William Forbes-Sempill =

William Forbes-Sempill may refer to:

- William Forbes-Sempill, 19th Lord Sempill, Scottish peer and air pioneer
- William Forbes-Sempill, 17th Lord Sempill, Scottish peer
