= Robert Sempill =

Robert Sempill may refer to:

- Robert Sempill, 3rd Lord Sempill (c. 1505–1576), Scottish Lord of Parliament
- Robert Sempill, 4th Lord Sempill (d.1611), Scottish Lord of Parliament
- Robert Sempill the elder (c. 1530–1595), Scottish ballad-writer and satirist
- Robert Sempill the younger (1595?–1663?), Scottish poet
- Robert Sempill (Jacobite) (1672–1737), Lord Sempill, Scottish soldier in French service
