= Brux =

Brux may refer to:

== Places ==
- Brüx, the German name for the city of Most in the Czech Republic
- Brux, Vienne, a commune in western France
- Brux Castle, Aberdeenshire

== Other uses ==
- Brux (musician), Australian musician, formerly Elizabeth Rose

== See also ==
- Bruxism
