= Francis Sempill (Jacobite) =

Jacobite agent in France

Francis Sempill (1708 – 1748), styled 2nd Lord Sempill from 1737, was a Jacobite of Scottish descent who became a leading agent for James Francis Edward Stuart in Paris.

== Early life ==
Sempill was the son of Robert Sempill and Elizabeth Abercromby. In 1712 his father had been created Lord Sempill of Dykehead in the Jacobite peerage and Sempill would use this title after his father's death in 1737. He was born at the exiled Stuart court at Château de Saint-Germain-en-Laye and educated at the Scots College, Douai.

== Jacobite agent ==
From 1730, Sempill became one of the most prominent and active Jacobite agents in France, and acted as the unofficial Stuart ambassador to Louis XV at Versailles after the Stuarts were forced to leave France for Rome due to the Anglo-French Alliance. Reflecting the confused nature of Jacobite politics at the time, Sempill worked alongside, and sometimes against, Daniel O'Brien and George Kelly who had also been commissioned to represent Stuart interests in France.

In the five years before the Jacobite rising of 1745, Sempill was responsible for greatly exaggerating Jacobite strength in order to gain French support, something which resulted in him earning enmity from both Jacobites and the French. After the death of Cardinal Fleury, Sempill carried a message to Louis XV from several prominent from English Tories, including the Earl of Cork, requesting support for a restoration of the Stuart line. The French foreign minister, Jean-Jacques Amelot de Chaillou, replied that considerable proof of English support for Jacobitism would be required before France could act. Sempill conveyed inflated and inaccurate confidence in the strength of the cause and a Franco-Jacobite invasion of Britain was planned towards the end of 1743. Such was Sempill's conviction that Prince Charles Stuart travelled to Paris, where he stayed at Sempill's house on the rue de l'Estrapade. The planned French expedition was, however, abandoned in the summer of 1744, by which time Prince Charles had lost trust in Sempill and publicly mocked him as "Lord Simple". Sempill was excluded from Prince Charles's plans for a new rising, but he subsequently worked to persuade Louis XV to mount an invasion during the 1745 rising. His efforts were embarrassed by the failure of England to rise in support of the rising and ended with Jacobite defeat at the Battle of Culloden. By this stage, Sempill had also lost the confidence of James Francis Edward Stuart.

He had married Lady Mary Caryll, widow of Hon. John Caryll and daughter of Kenneth Mackenzie, 4th Earl of Seaforth. Sempill died in 1748, isolated from the Jacobite court.

Peerage of Scotland
Preceded by Robert Sempill	— TITULAR — Lord Sempill of Dykehead; Jacobite peerage 1737–1748	Dormant
