= Lord Sempill =

Title in the Peerage of Scotland

Lordship of Sempill
- Creation date: c. 1489
- Created by: King James IV
- Peerage: Peerage of Scotland
- First holder: John Sempill, 1st Lord Sempill
- Present holder: James William Stuart Whitemore Sempill, 21st Lord Sempill
- Heir apparent: Hon. Francis Henry William Sempill, Master of Sempill
- Remainder to: the 1st Lord's heirs male of the body lawfully begotten.
- Status: Extant
- Motto: Keep Tryst
- Arms: Argent a Chevron checky Gules and of the field between three Hunting Horns Sable garnished and stringed of the second.

Lord Sempill (also variously rendered as Semple or Semphill) is a title in the Peerage of Scotland. It was created in circa 1489 for Sir John Sempill, founder of the collegiate Church of Lochwinnoch. Sempill was killed at the Battle of Flodden in 1513. His grandson, the third Lord, was known as "The Great Lord Sempill". His grandson, the fourth Lord, was Ambassador from King James VI of Scotland to Spain in 1596. The male line failed on the death of his great-grandson, the eighth Lord, in 1684. He was succeeded by his sister Anne, wife of Robert Abercromby, who in 1685 was created Lord Glassford for life. In 1688 she obtained a new charter settling the lordship of Sempill in default of male issue, upon her daughters without division by her then and any future husband. Her younger son, the twelfth Lord, commanded the left wing of the government army at the Battle of Culloden in 1746.

His great-grandson, the fifteenth Lord, died unmarried in 1835 and was succeeded by his younger sister Maria. She was the wife of Edward Chandler. In 1853 they were both allowed by Royal licence to assume the name and arms of Sempill only. However, they had no children and Maria was succeeded by her first cousin once removed Sir William Forbes, 8th Baronet, of Craigievar, who became the seventeenth Lord Sempill (see Forbes baronets of Craigievar for earlier history of this title). He was the grandson of the Hon. Sarah Sempill, eldest daughter of the thirteenth Lord Sempill. In 1885 he assumed by Royal licence the additional and principal surname of Sempill. His son, the eighteenth Lord, sat in the House of Lords as a Scottish representative peer from 1910 to 1934. His son, the nineteenth Lord, is known as an aviation pioneer who sold state secrets to the Japanese prior to World War Two and was also a Scottish Representative Peer between 1935 and 1963 (when all Scottish peers gained an automatic seat in the House of Lords). He fathered one daughter.

On the nineteenth Lord's death in 1965, the baronetcy and barony were separated: the lordship passed to his daughter Ann, the twentieth Lady Sempill, but the baronetcy could only be inherited by male heirs. After a two-year legal dispute to determine if he was a legitimate male successor, the nineteenth Lord's younger sibling, a trans man who had changed his legal gender from female to male in 1952, succeeded in the baronetcy as Sir Ewan Forbes, 11th Baronet. On Sir Ewan's death in 1991 the baronetcy was then inherited by the same person who had challenged the succession, his cousin Sir John Alexander Cumnock Forbes, 12th Baronet. (For information about the further succession of the baronetcy, see Forbes baronets of Craigievar.)

The twentieth Lady Sempill had married and divorced Eric Holt; she later married secondly Stuart Whitemore Chant, who in 1966 by decree of the Lord Lyon assumed the additional surname of Sempill. As of 2017 the title is held by Lady Sempill's eldest son from her second marriage, the twenty-first Lord, who succeeded in 1995.

In 1712, the exiled James Francis Edward Stuart recognised Robert Sempill, a descendant of the fifth Lord, as the legitimate holder of the title and made him Lord Sempill of Dykehead in the Jacobite peerage. This claim and title were never recognised by the British authorities.

== Lords Sempill (c. 1489) ==
- John Sempill, 1st Lord Sempill (d. 1513)
- William Sempill, 2nd Lord Sempill (d. 1552)
- Robert Sempill, 3rd Lord Sempill (c. 1505–1576)
- Robert Sempill, 4th Lord Sempill (d. 1611)
- Hugh Sempill, 5th Lord Sempill (d. 1639)
- Francis Sempill, 6th Lord Sempill (c. 1622–1644)
- Robert Sempill, 7th Lord Sempill (d. 1675)
- Francis Sempill, 8th Lord Sempill (c. 1660–1684)
- Anne Abercromby, 9th Lady Sempill (d. 1695)
- Francis Sempill, 10th Lord Sempill (c. 1685–1716)
- John Sempill, 11th Lord Sempill (d. 1727)
- Hugh Sempill, 12th Lord Sempill (1688–1746)
- John Sempill, 13th Lord Sempill (d. 1782)
- Hugh Sempill, 14th Lord Sempill (1758–1830)
- Selkirk Sempill, 15th Lord Sempill (1788–1835)
- Maria Janet Sempill, 16th Lady Sempill (1790–1884)
- William Forbes-Sempill, 17th Lord Sempill (1836–1905)
- John Forbes-Sempill, 18th Lord Sempill (1863–1934)
- William Francis Forbes-Sempill, 19th Lord Sempill (1893–1965)
- Ann Moira Forbes-Sempill, 20th Lady Sempill (1920–1995)
- James William Stuart Whitemore Sempill, 21st Lord Sempill (b. 1949)

The heir apparent is the present holder's son Hon. Francis Henry William Sempill, Master of Sempill (b. 1979)
The heir apparent’s heir apparent is his son, Felix Hew Forbes Sempill (b. 2012)

== Family tree ==
Forbes family tree

John de Forbes
Lord Forbes, c. 1444
Alexander Forbes c. 1380–1448; 1st Lord Forbes c. 1444–1448
James Forbes d. 1462; 2nd Lord Forbes; 1448–c. 1461
William Forbes d. 1483; 3rd Lord Forbes c. 1461–by 1488	Duncan Forbes	Patrick Forbes
Alexander Forbes d. c. 1491; 4th Lord Forbes by 1488–c. 1491	Arthur Forbes d. c. 1496; 5th Lord Forbes c. 1491–c. 1496	John Forbes d. 1547; 6th Lord Forbes c. 1496–1547	Forbes, later Stuart-Forbes, of Monymusk	Forbes, of Castle Forbes
William Forbes; 1513–1593; 7th Lord Forbes; 1547–1593
John Forbes; 1542–1606; First called "Master of Forbes", then 8th Lord Forbes; 1593–1606	William Forbes of Corse Castle d. 1627
Forbes baronets, of Castle Forbes, 1628
William Forbes; 1563–1592	John Forbes; 1570–1606 "(9th) Lord Forbes"; 1606–1606; His brief lordship was disputed and retroactively discounted. (Note: The numbering dispute vacillated over the years and was most recently (As of 2023) settled in 2018.)	Arthur Forbes; 1581–1641; 9th Lord Forbes; 1606–after 1634	John Forbes 8th of Pitsligo d. 1625	William of Craigievar	Arthur Forbes d. 1632; 1st Baronet of Castle Forbes
Lord Forbes of Pitsligo, 1633	Forbes baronets, of Craigievar Castle, in the County of Aberdeen, 1630	Viscount Granard and Baron Clanehugh, 1675; Earl of Granard, 1684
Alexander Forbes; 1600–1672; 10th Lord Forbes after 1634–1672	Anne	Alexander Forbes d. 1636; 1st Lord Forbes of Pitsligo; 1633–1636	William Forbes, 1st Baronet d. 1648; 1st Baronet of Craigievar and Fintray; 1630–1648	Arthur Forbes; 1623–1695; 1st Earl of Granard, etc., 2nd Baronet of Castle Forbes
William Forbes d. 1697; 11th Lord Forbes after 1672–1697	John Forbes of Moneymusk d. c. 1713; 3rd Baronet of Monymusk	Alexander Forbes d. 1690; 2nd Lord Forbes of Pitsligo; 1636–1690	Alexander Forbes of Foveran d. 1697	John Forbes, 2nd Baronet ("Red Sir John"); 1636–1703; 2nd Baronet of Craigievar and Fintray; 1648–1703	Arthur Forbes c. 1656–1734; 2nd Earl of Granard, etc., 3rd Baronet of Castle Forbes
William Forbes; 1656–1716; 12th Lord Forbes; 1697–1716	William Forbes of Monymusk; 4th Baronet of Monymusk	John Forbes b. 1680	Alexander Forbes c. 1655–1690; 3rd Lord Forbes of Pitsligo; 1690–1690	Samuel Forbes, 1st Baronet; 1653–1717; 1st Baronet of Foveran	John Forbes, of Knaperna	William Forbes, 3rd Baronet; 1660–c. 1730; 3rd Baronet of Craigievar and Fintray; 1703–c. 1730	George Forbes; 1685–1765; 3rd Earl of Granard, etc., 4th Baronet of Castle Forbes
William Forbes d. 1730; 13th Lord Forbes; 1716–1730	James Forbes; 1689–1761; 15th Lord Forbes; 1734–1761	Mary Forbes	John Forbes d. 1715	Alexander Forbes; 1678–1762; 4th Lord Forbes of Pitsligo; 1691–1748	William Forbes	Alexander Forbes, 2nd Baronet d. before 1755; 2nd Baronet of Foveran	Samuel Forbes, of Knaperna	Arthur Forbes; 1709–1773; 4th Baronet of Craigievar and Fintray c. 1730–1773	George Forbes; 1710–1769; 4th Earl of Granard, etc., 5th Baronet of Castle Forbes
Lordship Forbes of Pitsligo attainted, 1748
Francis Forbes; 1721–1734; 14th Lord Forbes; 1730–1734	James Forbes c. 1725–1804; 16th Lord Forbes; 1761–1804	William Forbes d. 1743; 5th Baronet of Monymusk; 1715–1743	Christian Forbes; 1705–1789	Forbes Baronets of Newe in the County of Aberdeen Charles Forbes; 1774–1849; 1st Baronet of Newe; 1823–1849	John Forbes d. c. 1760; 3rd Baronet of Knaperna	George Forbes; 1740–1780; 5th Earl of Granard, etc., 6th Baronet of Castle Forbes
Baronetcy of Foveran/Knaperna dormant, c. 1760
Baron Granard (UK), 1806
James Ochoncar Forbes; 1765–1843; 17th Lord Forbes; 1804–1843	William Forbes; 1739–1806; 6th Baronet of Monymusk, and later Pitsligo; 1743–1806	William Forbes; 1755–1816; 5th Baronet of Craigievar and Fintray; 1773–1816	George Forbes; 1760–1837; 6th Earl of Granard, etc., 1st Baron Granard, 7th Baronet of Castle Forbes
Walter Gammell Forbes; 1798–1868; 18th Lord Forbes; 1843–1868	Charlotte Elizabeth	William Forbes; 1773–1828; 7th Baronet of Monymusk; 1806–1828 [m. Williamina, daughter of Sir John Stuart/Belshes/Belshes-Wishart (3rd Baronet (S. 1707) of Fettercairn co. Kincardine]	Arthur Forbes, 6th Baronet; 1784–1823; 6th Baronet of Craigievar and Fintray; 1816–1823	John Forbes, 7th Baronet; 1785–1846; 7th Baronet of Craigievar and Fintray; 1823–1846	George Forbes; 1785–1836 styled Viscount Forbes
John Stuart Hepburn Forbes; 1804–1866; 8th Baronet of Monymusk, and later of Invermay and Balmanno; 1828–1866 [Inherited Invermay and Balmanno as heir and cousin of Alexander Hepburn-Murray-Belshes d. 1864]	Charles Hay Forbes; 1806–1859	William Forbes-Sempill; 1836–1905; 17th Lord Sempill; 1884–1905; 8th Baronet of Craigievar and Fintray; 1846–1905 (married Carlone Louisa, daughter of Charles Forbes, 3rd Baronet of Newe)	James Ochoncar Forbes; 1837–1900	George Arthur Hastings Forbes; 1833–1889; 7th Earl of Granard, etc., 2nd Baron Granard, 8th Baronet of Castle Forbes
Horace Courtenay Gammell Forbes; 1829–1914; 19th Lord Forbes; 1868–1914	Atholl Monson Forbes; 1841–1916; 20th Lord Forbes; 1914–1916	William Forbes; 1835–1906; 9th Baronet of Monymusk, Invermay, and Balmanno; 1866–1906	John Forbes-Sempill; 1863–1934; 18th Lord Sempill, 9th Baronet of Craigievar and Fintray; 1905–1934	Arthur Lionel Ochoncar Forbes-Sempill; 1877–1962	James Ochoncar Forbes; 1867–1945	Bernard Arthur William Patrick Hastings Forbes; 1874–1948; 8th Earl of Granard, etc., 3rd Baron Granard, 9th Baronet of Castle Forbes
Atholl Laurence Cunyngham; 1882–1953; 21st Lord Forbes; 1916–1953	Charles Hay Hepburn Stuart-Forbes of Pitsligo; 1871–1921; 10th Baronet of Monymusk, Invermay, and Balmanno; 1906–1921	William Francis Forbes-Sempill; 1893–1965; 19th Lord Sempill, 10th Baronet of Craigievar and Fintray; 1934–1965
Nigel Ivan Forbes; 1918–2013; 22nd Lord Forbes; 1953–2013	Ann Forbes-Sempill; 1920–1995; 20th Lady Sempill	Ewan Forbes; 1912–1991; 11th Baronet of Craigievar and Fintray; 1965–1991	John Alexander Cumnock Forbes; 1927–2000; 12th Baronet of Craigievar and Fintray; 1991–2000	Patrick Walter Forbes; 1914–1979	Arthur Patrick Hastings Forbes; 1915–1992; 9th Earl of Granard, etc., 4th Baron Granard, 10th Baronet of Castle Forbes	John Forbes; 1920–1982
Malcolm Nigel Forbes b. 1946; 23rd Lord Forbes since 2013	James Sempill b. 1949; 21st Lord Sempill	Andrew Iain Ochoncar Forbes; 1945–2003; 13th Baronet of Craigievar and Fintray; 2000–2003	Peter Arthur Edward Hastings Forbes b. 1957; 10th Earl of Granard, etc., 5th Baron Granard, 11th Baronet of Castle Forbes
Francis Henry William Sempill b. 1979 styled Master of Sempill	James Patrick Ochoncar Forbes b. 1986; 14th Baronet of Craigievar and Fintray since 2003	David Ian Ochoncar Forbes b. 1993; Heir presumptive to the Baronetage of Craigievar and Fintray	Jonathan Peter Hastings Forbes b. 1981 styled Viscount Forbes

== See also ==
- Forbes baronets, of Craigievar
