= Lord Sempill of Dykehead =

Lord Sempill of Dykehead was a title of the Jacobite peerage in the Peerage of Scotland. It was created on 11 May 1712 by James Francis Edward Stuart for Robert Sempill, a grandson of Hugh Sempill, 5th Lord Sempill. James issued a "declaration of nobility" recognising Robert as the legitimate holder of the 1489 creation of Lord Sempill, despite that title being extant in the Peerage of Scotland. The Lords Sempill of Dykehead were never recognised by the British authorities, with the original creation remaining the only legal title. The Jacobite title became dormant on the death of the second holder.

== Lords Sempill of Dykehead (Jacobite Peerage, 1712) ==
- Robert Sempill, 1st Lord Sempill of Dykehead (1672–1737)
- Francis Sempill, 2nd Lord Sempill of Dykehead (1708–1748)
