= George Muirhead (naturalist) =

Dr George Muirhead FRSE LLD (1845-1928) was a 20th-century Scottish naturalist and artist.

== Life ==
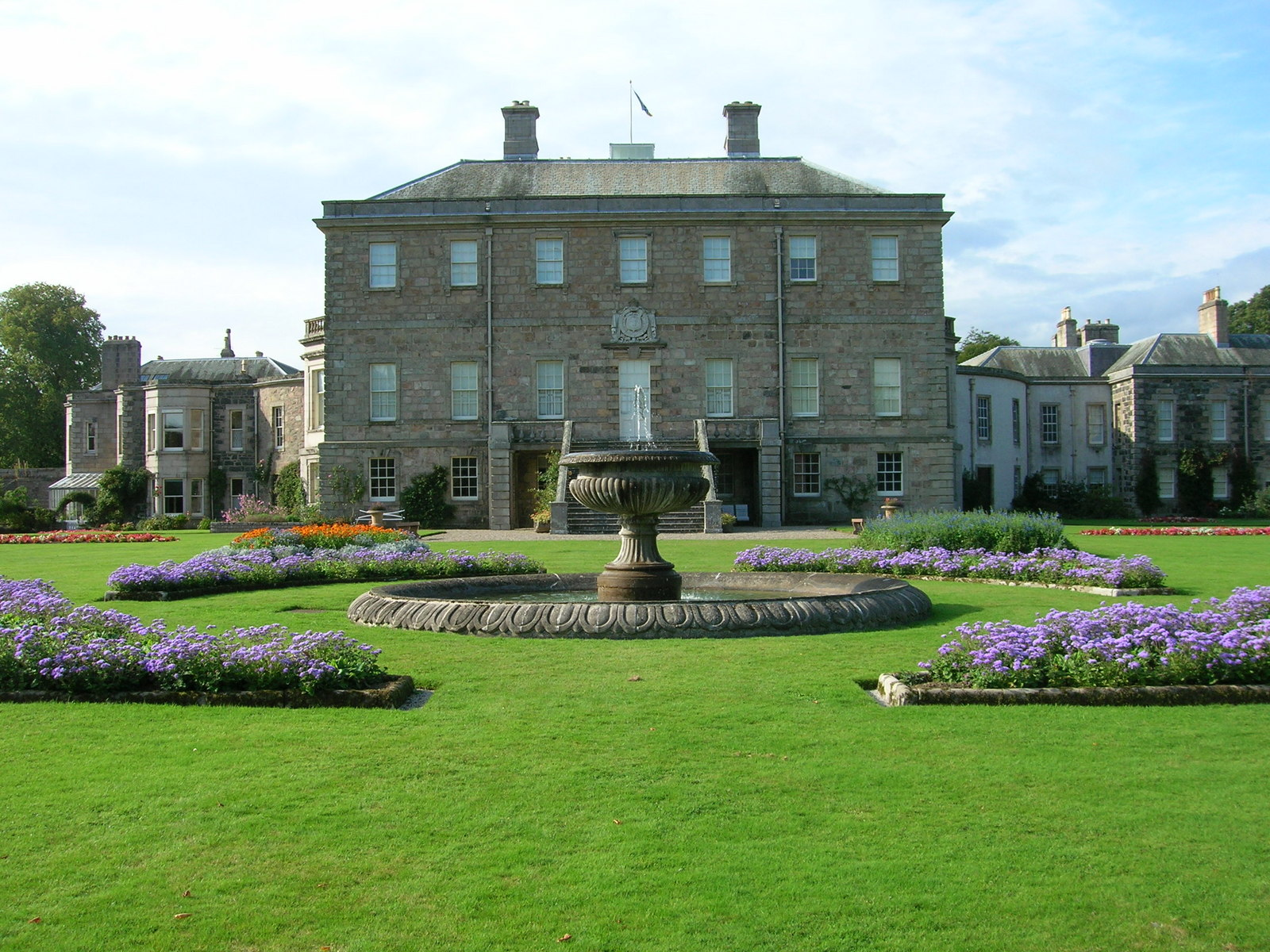
Haddo House

He was born in Saltoun in East Lothian in 1845, the son of a farmer.

From around 1865 he was a Factor on a Berwickshire estate, overseeing managerial issues. He moved to be Factor of Haddo House around 1880, working under the Marquess of Aberdeen. From 1897 to 1923 he was Commissioner to the Duke of Richmond and Gordon at Fochabers.

He died at Fochabers in 1928.

== Academic honours ==
In 1888 he was elected a Fellow of the Royal Society of Edinburgh. His proposers were David Milne Home, Ramsay Heatley Traquair, J. A. Harvey Brown, and Alexander Buchan. Aberdeen University awarded him an honorary doctorate (LLD) in 1925.

== Publications ==
- Birds of Berwickshire vol.1 (1889)
- Birds of Berwickshire vol.2 (1895)

== Family ==
He married twice: firstly to Agnes Grieve Clay of Kerchesters, a gifted artist of birds. They had three sons.

Secondly, in 1907, he married the Hon Katherine Forbes-Sempill, daughter of William Forbes-Sempill, 17th Lord Sempill.
