= William Forbes-Sempill, 17th Lord Sempill =

Scottish peer (1836–1905)

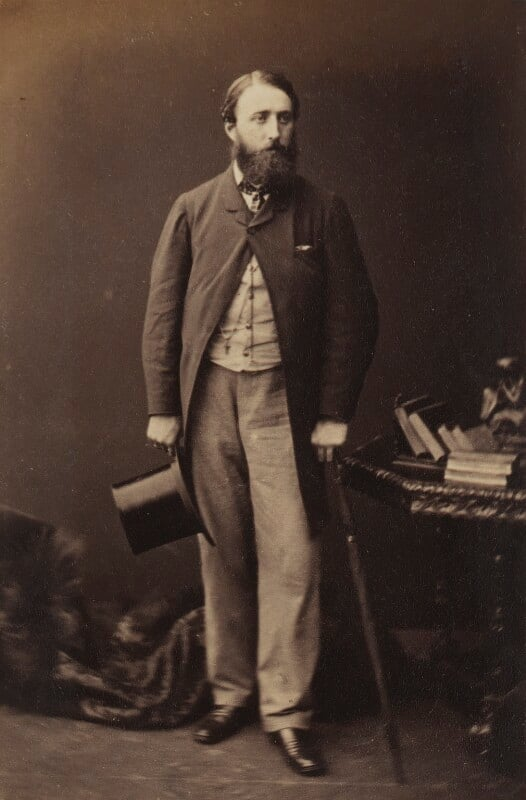
Forbes-Sempill in the early 1860s

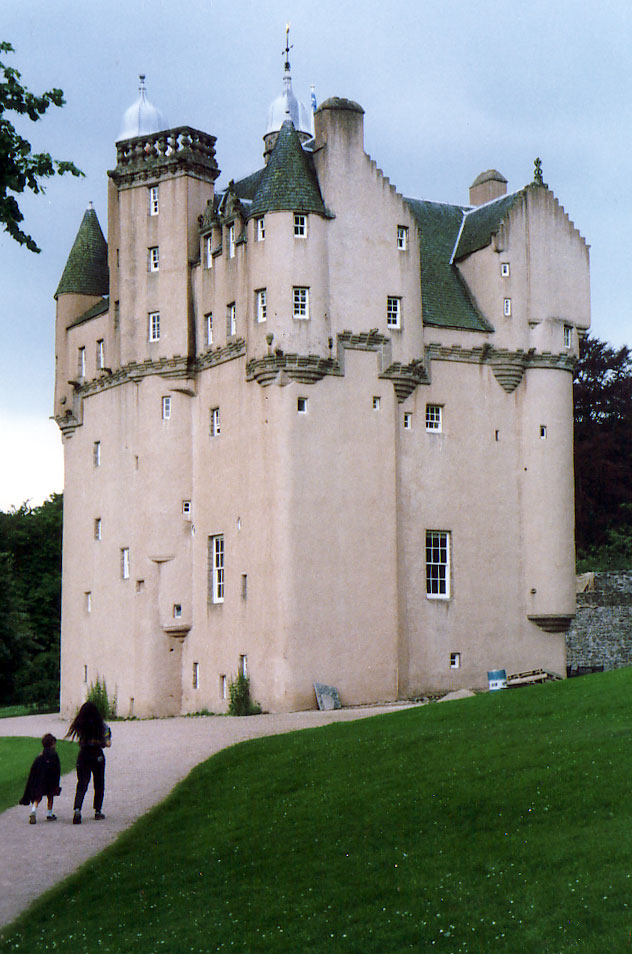
Craigievar Castle, home of the Forbes family

William Forbes-Sempill, 17th Lord Sempill (20 May 1836 – 21 July 1905), born William Forbes, was a Scottish peer, the 17th Lord Sempill and 8th Baronet of Craigievar.

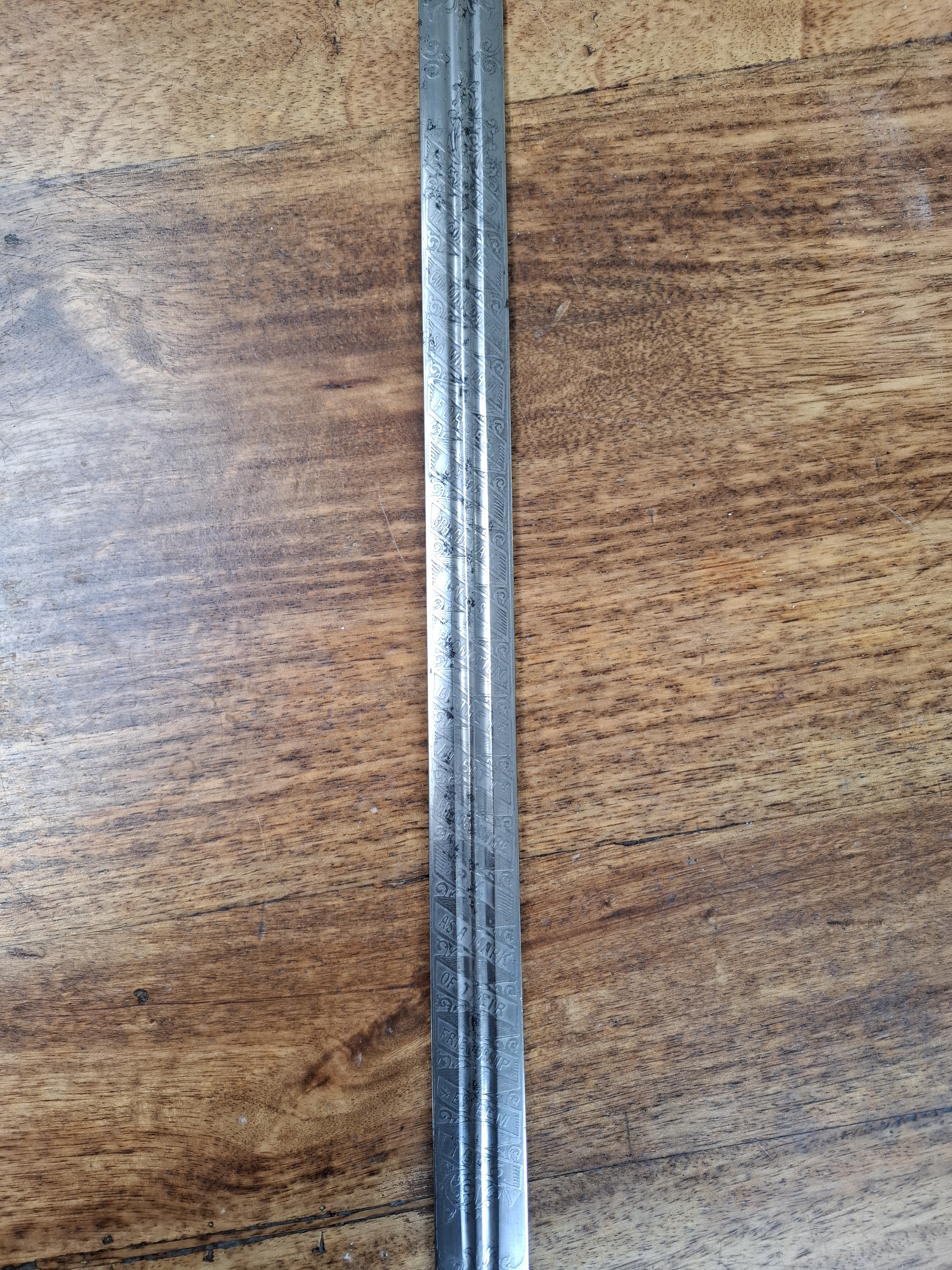
Ceremonial sword for military promotion 1873

He was the son of Sir John Forbes, 7th Baronet, and succeeded his father to the baronetcy on his death in February 1846, at the age of seven. He was educated at Eton and then joined the Coldstream Guards in 1854; he served in the Crimean War, rising to the rank of captain. In 1873 he was promoted to Colonel Commandant and presented with a sword inscribed "Presented to Colonel Commandant Sir William Forbes, Bt of Craigievar, on his promotion, by the 1st Ad Battn, Aberdeenshire RV, as a mark of their friendship and esteem 1873".

In 1884, he inherited the title of Lord Sempill from his relation Maria Jane Sempill, 16th Lady Sempill, and adopted the surname of Sempill.

He married three times, the first time in 1858 to Caroline, the only daughter of Sir Charles Forbes, 3rd Baronet; this ended in divorce in 1861, after the birth of one daughter, Katherine. Katherine married the naturalist George Muirhead FRSE in 1907.

The second marriage was in 1862 to Frances Emily Abercromby, the youngest daughter of Sir Robert Abercromby, 5th Baronet, in 1862. They had seven children, five sons and two daughters. Their third son, William, died aged one. The remaining sons served in the military. The eldest, John commanded a battalion of the Black Watch at the Battle of Loos. The second son, Douglas, a Major in the Seaforth Highlanders, was killed on the North-West Frontier of India in 1908. The fourth son, Robert, a Lieutenant in the 5th Bn. Gordon Highlanders, was killed by a sniper on 2 June 1915, aged 45, near Festubert whilst working with his men repairing a gap blown in the parapet of their trench. He is buried in Le Touret Military Cemetery. The youngest of the four, Arthur, was in the Royal Navy, and survived the Battle of Jutland. The elder daughter, Evelyn, married Duncan Vernon Pirie MP, whilst the younger, Gertrude, never married.

The third marriage was in 1890, to Mary Sherbrooke.

On his death in 1905, his titles were inherited by his son John.

Coat of arms of William Forbes-Sempill, 17th Lord Sempill
Coronet A coronet of a Baron Crest 1st, a stag’s head argent, attired with ten tynes azure, collared with a prince’s crown or; 2nd, A cock proper. Escutcheon Quarterly: 1st and 4th argent, a chevron cheeky gules and of the field, between three hunting horns sable, garnished and stringed of the second, (Sempill); 2nd and 4rd azure, a cross patée fitchée or, between three bear’s heads couped argent, muzzled gules, (Forbes of Craigievar). Supporters Two greyhounds argent, collared gules. Motto 1st Keep Tryst; 2nd Watch.

Peerage of Scotland
Preceded by Maria Sempill	Lord Sempill; 1884–1905	Succeeded by John Forbes-Sempill
Baronetage of Nova Scotia
Preceded by John Forbes	Baronet (of Craigievar); 1846–1905	Succeeded by John Forbes-Sempill
