= Robert Sempill (Jacobite) =

Scottish Jacobite and soldier

Robert Sempill (1672 – 11 November 1737), styled Lord Sempill from 1712, was a Scottish Jacobite and soldier in French service.

== Biography ==
Sempill was born at Castle Semple, Scotland, the son of Hon. Archibald Sempill of Dykehead and the grandson of Hugh Sempill, 5th Lord Sempill. Being a Roman Catholic, he was sent to be educated in France and by 1688 was an ensign in the French royal Scottish Guards. In 1708 he became a captain in the Regiment of Galmoy before transferring to the Regiment of Dillon in the Irish Brigade in 1715.

On 11 May 1712, Sempill was the subject of a "declaration of nobility" by the exiled James Francis Edward Stuart, which recognised Semphill as the legitimate heir of his Lord Semphill ancestors and thereby created him Lord Sempill of Dykehead in the Jacobite peerage. This was despite the title in the Peerage of Scotland remaining extant with Francis Sempill, 10th Lord Sempill as the holder.

He married Elizabeth Abercromby and they had four children. He was succeeded by his eldest son, Francis Sempill, who became a leading Jacobite agent in Paris.

Peerage of Scotland
New title	— TITULAR — Lord Sempill of Dykehead; Jacobite peerage 1712–1737	Succeeded by Francis Sempill
