= Kildrummy =

Hamlet in Aberdeenshire, Scotland

Coordinates: 57°14′45″N 2°52′52″W

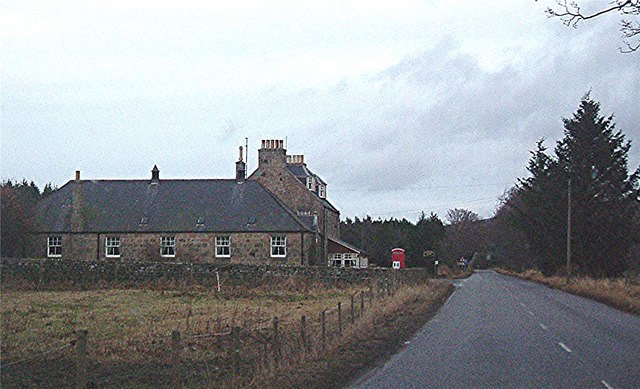
The Kildrummy Inn

Kildrummy (Scottish Gaelic: Cionn Droma) is a hamlet in Aberdeenshire, Scotland near the River Don, 7 miles (11 kilometres) west of Alford. The hamlet's primary school closed in 2003.

Its church was built in 1805. Nearby Kildrummy Castle has a long history dating back to at least the 14th century. The site of Brux Castle is also about 1 1/2 miles (2.5 kilometres) away.

== Sources ==
- Kildrummy in the Gazetteer for Scotland.

Specific
