= John Oswald Mair Hunter, Lord Hunter =

Scottish advocate

John Oswald Mair Hunter, Lord Hunter VRD (1913–2006) was a 20th-century Scottish advocate who served as a Senator of the College of Justice. He was known to friends as Jack Hunter.

== Life ==
He was born in Edinburgh on 21 February 1913 the son of John Mair Hunter QC. He was educated at Edinburgh Academy and Rugby School. He studied law at both New College, Oxford and Edinburgh University. He passed both the English and Scottish bar as an advocate in 1937.

In September 1939 as an officer in the Royal Navy Volunteer Reserve he was called up prior to the onset of the Second World War serving on the mine-layer Menestheus. He reached the rank of Lt Commander.

After the war he practiced as an advocate in Edinburgh. He became King's Counsel in 1951 (Queen's Counsel following the coronation of Elizabeth II). In 1957 he became Sheriff Principal of Argyll and Bute. In 1972 he became Sheriff of Roxburgh, Berwick and Selkirk.

In October 1961 he was elected a Senator of the College of Justice under the title of Lord Hunter. A decided hard-liner he spoke out against what he called the "sociological nonsense" of excusing crime due to poor social backgrounds.

He served as Chairman of the Scottish Law Commission from 1971 to 1981. From 1981 until retirement in 1986 he served on the Inner Court of the Court of Session (as an appeal judge).

He died on 20 March 2006 aged 93.

== Other positions of note ==
- Chairman of the RNLI
- Chairman of the Scottish Council of Salmon and Trout Association

== Notable cases ==
- In 1964 he ruled in the Harris tweed case that this name could only be used for fabric wholly made on the Isle of Harris.
- In 1966 he expressed deep concern that a murderer might serve a lesser sentence than one convicted of culpable homicide due to the workings of the Scottish legal system, when he observed that the accused found guilty of accidentally killing his two sisters would serve a shorter sentence if he pleaded guilty of murder.

== Family ==
In 1959 he was married to Doris Mary Simpson. They had one daughter. Following her death in 1988 he married Angela Marion McLean.
