= Ann Forbes-Sempill, 20th Lady Sempill =

Scottish peer

The Right Honourable The Lady Sempill

Member of the House of Lords Lord Temporal
- In office 30 December 1965 – 6 July 1995; Hereditary Peerage
- Preceded by: The 19th Lord Sempill
- Succeeded by: The 21st Lord Sempill

Personal details
- Born: Ann Moira Sempill; 19 March 1920
- Died: 6 July 1995 (aged 75)
- Spouses: Eric Holt (m. 1941; div. 1946); Stuart Chant-Sempill (m. 1948; died 1995)
- Children: 3
- Parent: William Forbes-Sempill, 19th Lord Sempill (father)
- Relatives: John Lavery (grandfather)

Military service
- Allegiance: United Kingdom
- Branch/service: Women's Royal Naval Service
- Rank: Petty officer

Ann Moira Forbes-Sempill, 20th Lady Sempill (19 March 1920 – 6 July 1995) was a Scottish politician, aristocrat, and pilot. As the holder of a hereditary peerage, she was a member of the House of Lords.

== Early life ==
Ann Moira Sempill was born on 19 March 1920. Her father, William Forbes-Sempill, 19th Lord Sempill, was an air pioneer and spy for the Empire of Japan.

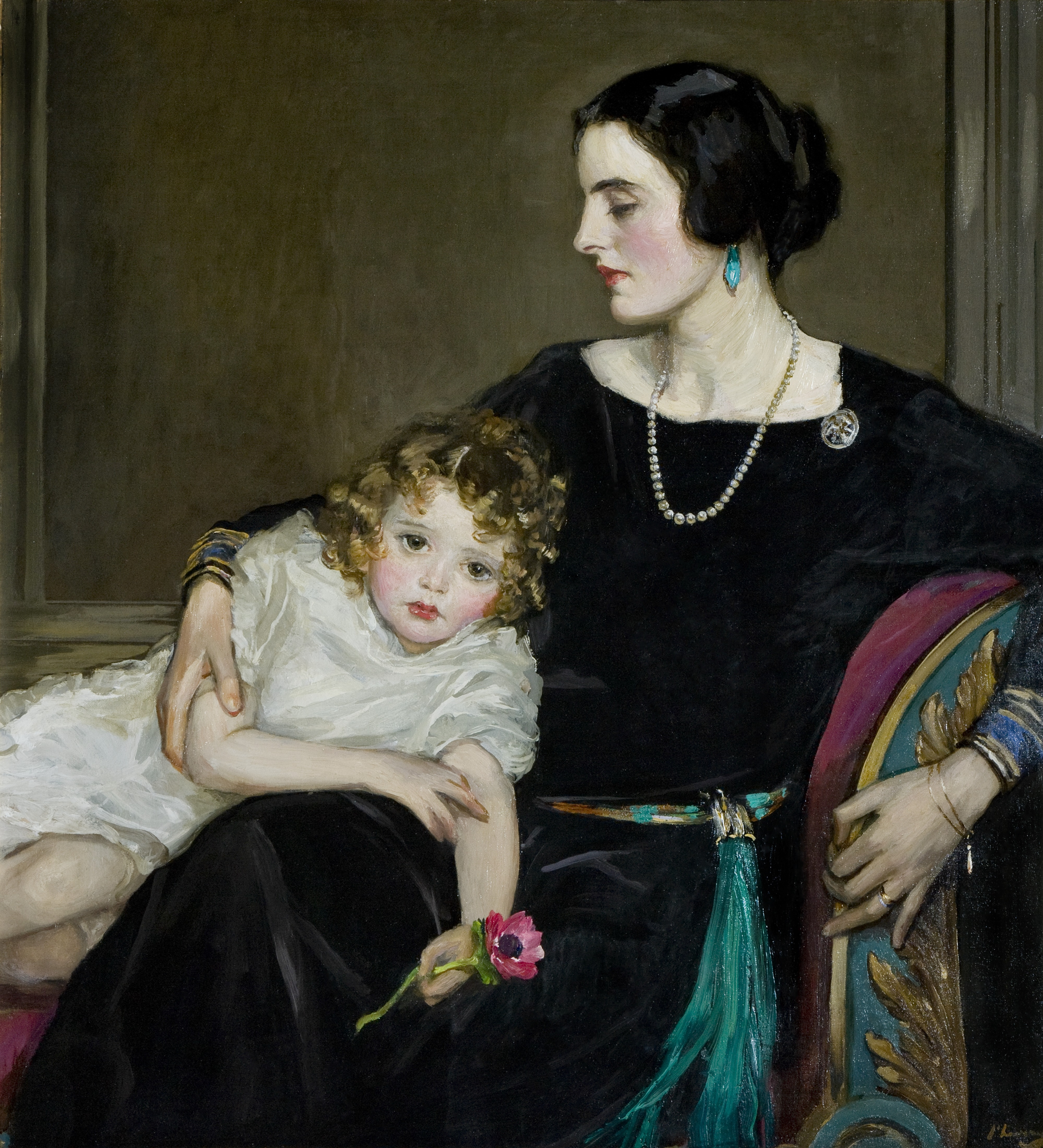
Sir John Lavery – Anne Moira and the Honourable Mrs Forbes-Sempill

She and her mother, Eileen (née Lavery), Lady Sempill, are depicted in a 1923 painting by her maternal grandfather John Lavery. Her mother was a horsewoman and pilot, who had an older daughter Diana by her first marriage in Tangiers. Eileen Lady Semphill died of tuberculosis in 1935. Semphill's younger sister June died age 18 on 11 May 1941 during the last day of the London Blitz, working for the W.V.S. Mobile Canteen Service.

Sempill was educated in Austrian, German and English Convents. She and her sister had been passengers in aircraft since they were toddlers. She became interested in flying and decided to apply for a pilot's A licence to become a qualified pilot, eventually succeeding and becoming proficient by 1941. She offered the First Fruits at the 1938 Gorsedh Kernow bard initiation ceremony. During World War II, she was a Women's Royal Naval Service petty officer between 1939 and 1942. She joined the Anglo Austrian Society's committee in 1966.

== Personal life ==
She was married to Eric Holt, a member of the Manchester Regiment from Oxford, from 25 October 1941 until their divorce in 1945; they had one daughter. On 28 October 1948, she later married Lieutenant-Colonel Stuart Whitemore Chant OBE MC, who served in the Gordon Highlanders and the No. 5 Commando. In 1966 he assumed the additional surname of Sempill by decree of the Lord Lyon. They had two children: James Sempill, 21st Lord Sempill, and Lieutenant-Colonel Ian Chant-Sempill (1951–2017).

== Peerage ==
On her father's death on 30 December 1965, she succeeded to the title of Lord Sempill and, by extension, his seat in the House of Lords, remaining until her death. She became a Conservative peer on 19 July 1966. Her maiden speech at the House was on 7 February 1967, in which she asked the government to address the issue of juvenile delinquency.

Forbes-Sempill died on 6 July 1995.

== Coat of arms ==
Coat of arms of Ann Forbes-Sempill, 20th Lady Sempill
Coronet A coronet of a Baron Crest 1st, a stag’s head argent, attired with ten tynes azure, collared with a prince’s crown or; 2nd, A cock proper. Escutcheon Quarterly: 1st and 4th argent, a chevron cheeky gules and of the field, between three hunting horns sable, garnished and stringed of the second, (Sempill); 2nd and 4rd azure, a cross patée fitchée or, between three bear’s heads couped argent, muzzled gules, (Forbes of Craigievar). Supporters Two greyhounds argent, collared gules. Motto 1st Keep Tryst; 2nd Watch.

Peerage of Scotland
Preceded by William Forbes-Sempill	Lord Sempill; 1965–1995	Succeeded by James Sempill
