= Brux Castle =

Coordinates: 57.24015°N 2.8451°W

Brux Castle was a castle of the Forbeses, about 1.5 miles (2.4 km) east of Kildrummy, Aberdeenshire, Scotland, south of the river Don. The castle was also known as the Tower of Brux.

The derelict Mains of Brux is on the site.

== History ==
A branch of the Forbes family owned the manor of Brux from 1409 through marriage to the heiress; it was raised to a barony in 1504–1505. The `manor house of Brux’ was referred to as a gentleman's seat in 1724.

== Structure ==
There is little evidence of the structure, although some stonework on the Mains of Brux is probably from the castle.

- Castles in Great Britain and Ireland
- List of castles in Scotland
