= Craigievar Castle =

Castle in Aberdeenshire, Scotland

Coordinates: 57.1742°N 2.7181°W

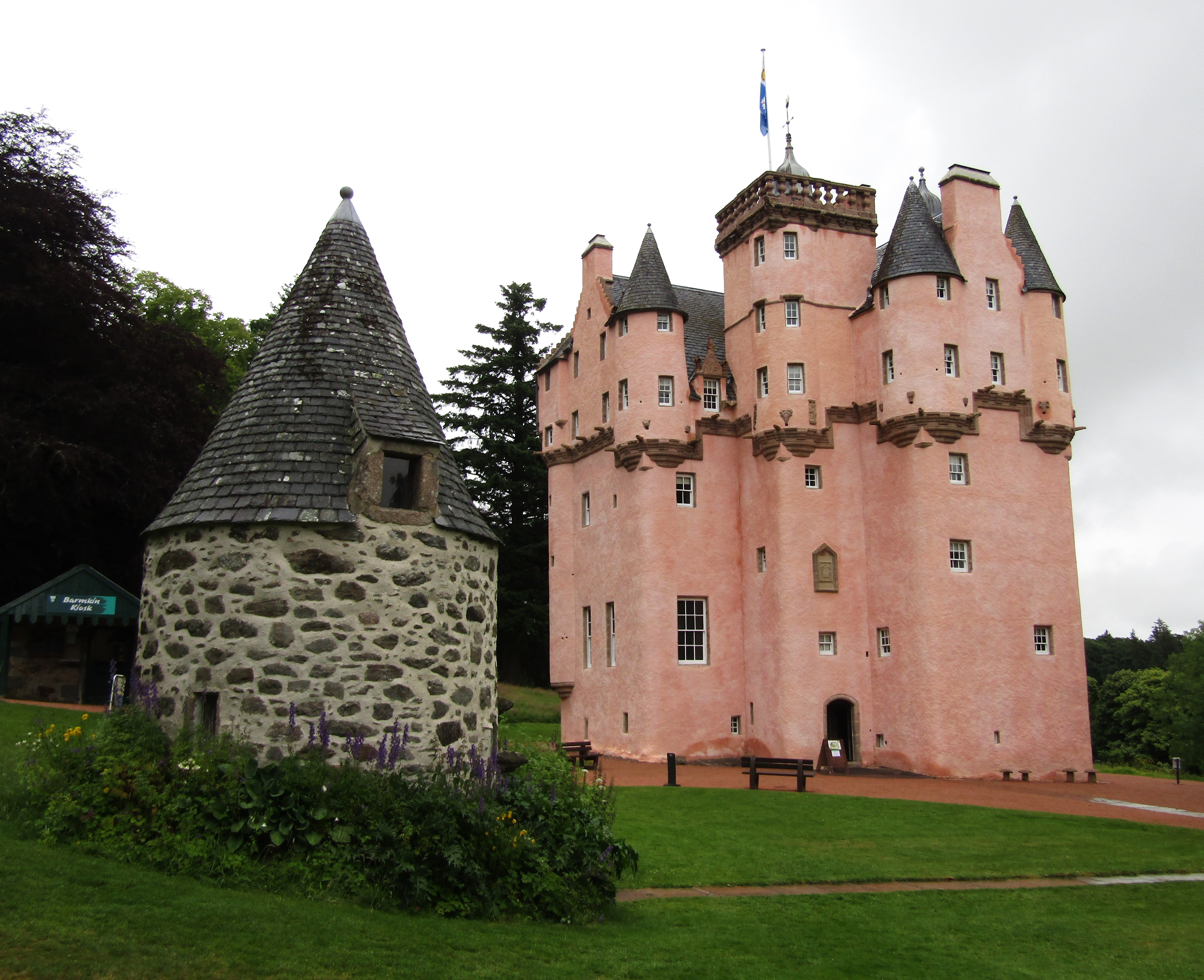
- Craigievar Castle in 2024

Site information
- Website: Craigievar Castle

Inventory of Gardens and Designed Landscapes in Scotland
- Official name: Craigievar Castle
- Designated: 1 July 1987
- Reference no.: GDL00114

Location

Craigievar Castle is a harled castle or fortified country house 6 miles (9.7 km) south of Alford, Aberdeenshire, Scotland. It was the seat of Clan Sempill, and the Forbes family resided here for 350 years until 1963, when the property was sold to the National Trust for Scotland by the 19th Lord Sempill.

== History ==
An example of the original Scottish Baronial architecture, the seven-storey castle was completed in 1626 by the Aberdonian merchant William Forbes, ancestor of the Forbes baronets of Craigievar and brother of the Bishop of Aberdeen, Patrick Forbes of Corse Castle. Forbes purchased the partially completed structure from the impoverished Mortimer family in the year 1610. He arranged for the continued construction, completing it in 1625 or 1626.

Forbes was nicknamed "Danzig Willy", a reference to his shrewd international trading success with the Baltic states. Some used the nickname "Willy the Merchant", also based on the substantial profits he made while "merchandising at Dantzick", according to one source.

William's son became a baronet of Nova Scotia by Charles I; this title is now extant. The Forbes Baronetcy, of Craigievar in the County of Aberdeen, was created in the Baronetage of Nova Scotia on 20 April 1630 for William Forbes. He was also a descendant of Hon. Patrick Forbes, third son of the second Lord Forbes, and the nephew of the first baronet of the 1628 creation. The fourth baronet represented Aberdeenshire in the House of Commons. The 5th Baronet married the Hon. Sarah Sempill, eldest daughter of Hugh Sempill, 12th Lord Sempill. Their grandson, the eighth Baronet, succeeded as seventeenth Lord Sempill in 1884 (see the Lord Sempill for earlier history of this title). The titles remained united until the death of his grandson, the 19th Lord and tenth Baronet, in 1965.

Designed in the L-plan, as was Muchalls Castle, which is located in the same region, Craigievar is noted for its crafted plasterwork ceilings. Craigevar, Muchalls Castle and Glamis Castle are generally considered to have the three finest ceilings in Scotland. The Clan Forbes family was close friends of the Clan Burnett of Leys, who built both Crathes Castle and Muchalls Castle. The ceilings feature plaster figures of the Nine Worthies and other family emblems.

=== 19th century ===
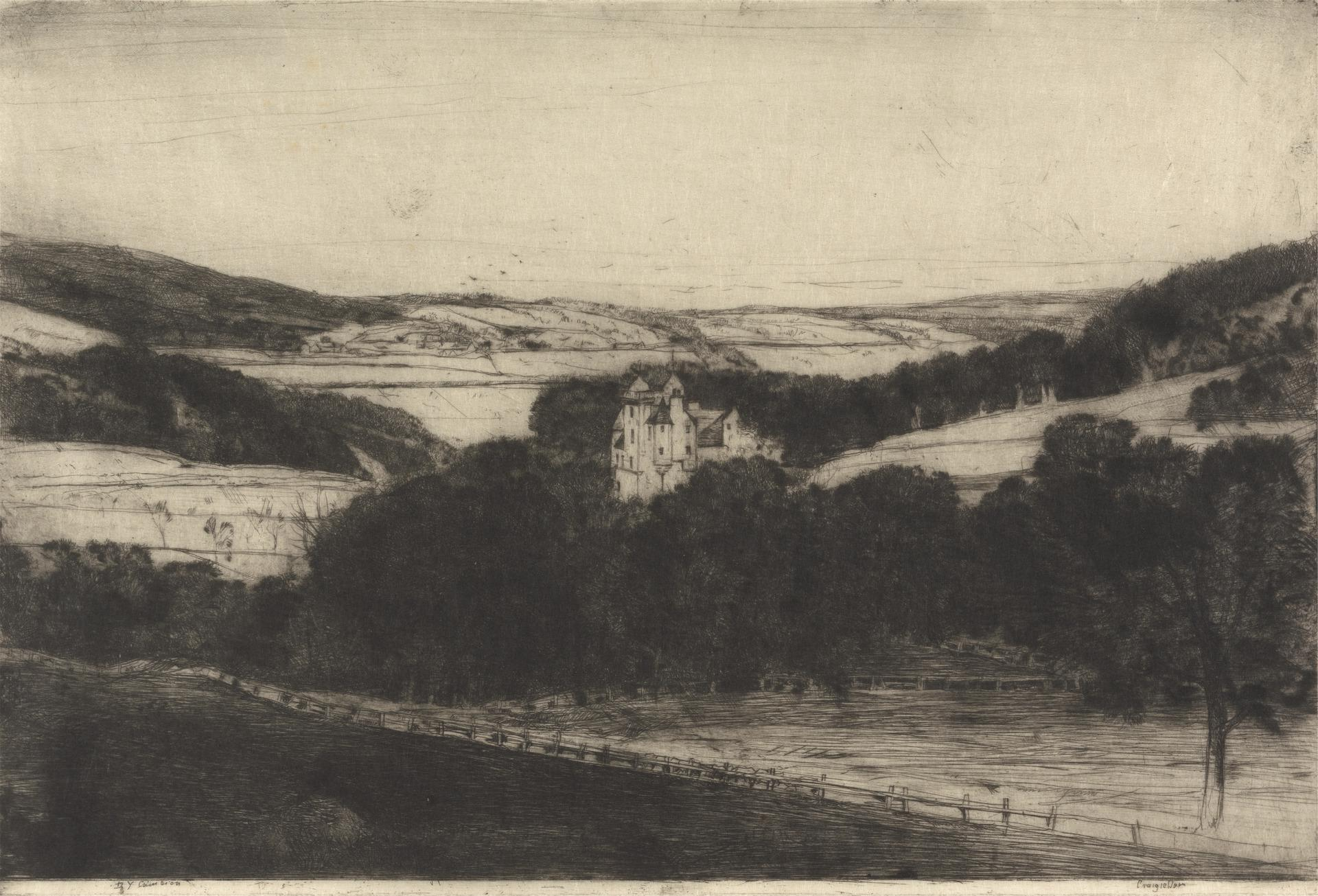
Craigievar Castle, David Young Cameron, drypoint, 1908

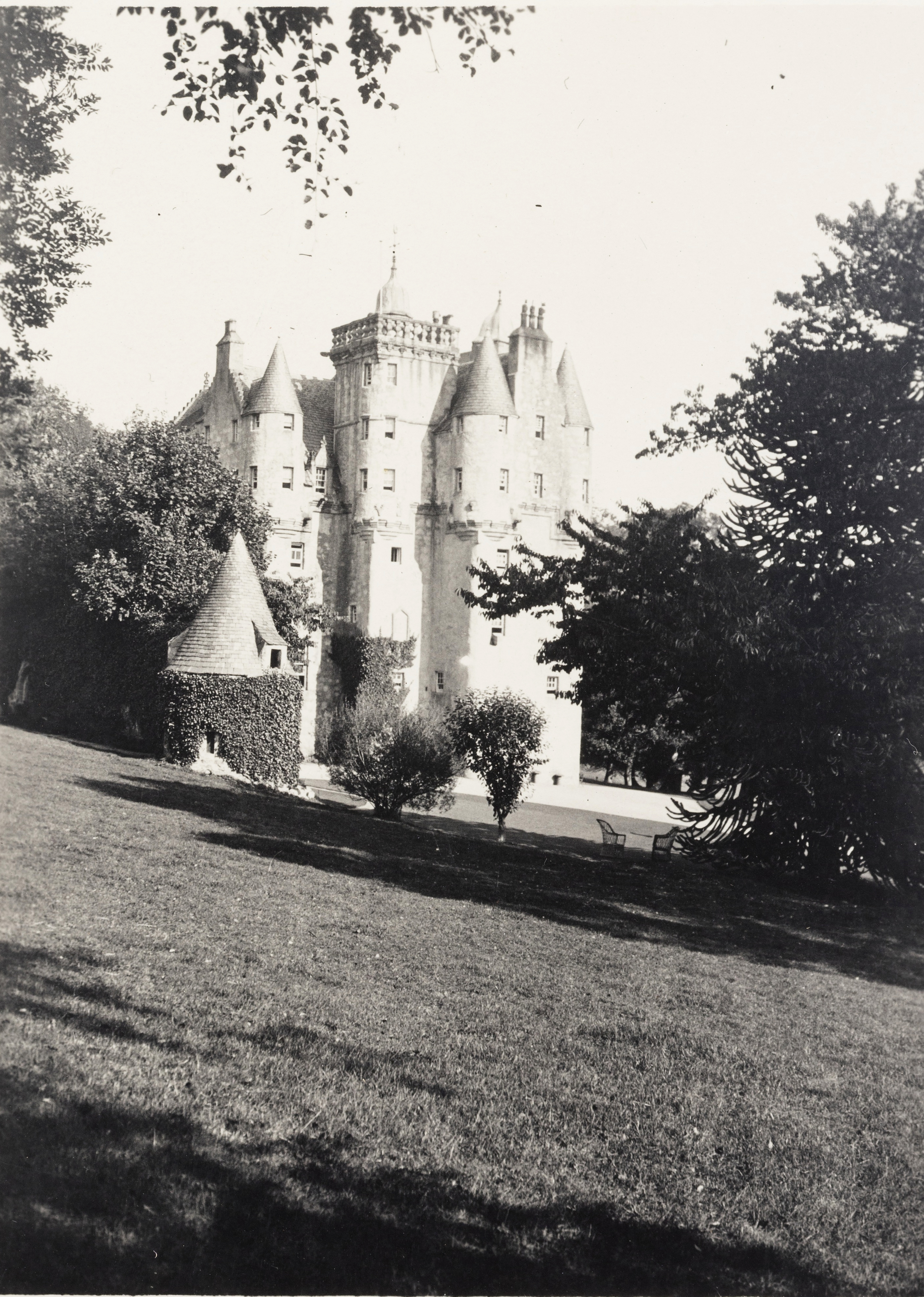
The castle c. 1907

By the early 1800s, the tower had fallen into decay. Sir John Forbes had considered demolishing the tower and consulted the Aberdeen city architect John Smith, who advised against that course of action, stating the tower was: "one of the finest specimens in the Country of the age and style in which it was built." He decided to restore the building. Roof repairs were undertaken circa 1826; a timber base covered with slates was used. At about the same time, "the towers were altered and raised and a new entrance door was put in, which was subsequently restored to the original entrance" according to the records of the Aberdeenshire Council.

Reconstruction of almost the entire top floor was also completed. The windows, external harling and pointing were replaced, and it is likely Smith also designed the gardener's cottage.

The castle originally had more defensive elements including a walled courtyard with four round towers; only one of the round towers remains today. In the arched door to that round tower are preserved the carved initials of Sir Thomas Forbes, William Forbes' son. There is also a massive iron portcullis or gate covering the entrance door which is named a yett.

According to the folklore of the area, the castle is haunted by one or more ghosts.

=== 20th century ===
The Forbes family also owned a large granite house at Fintray near Inverurie, Aberdeenshire. This became the family's main residence for a number of years until the Second World War. During the war, Fintray House was used as a hospital for wounded Belgian soldiers.

In 1963, the family sold Craigievar estate to the National Trust for Scotland, which took over operation. Since 1990, the estate has been a listed building of the Aberdeenshire Council.

By the late 1970s, the castle interior boasted a Great Hall that has the Stuart Arms over the fireplace; a musicians' gallery; secret staircase connecting the high tower to the Great Hall; Queen's Bedroom; servants' quarters and several plasterwork ceilings. There was a collection of Forbes family portraits inside as well as a considerable quantity of Forbes furnishings dating to the 17th and 18th centuries. The castle also housed two original Henry Raeburn portraits complete with original receipts.

== 21st century ==
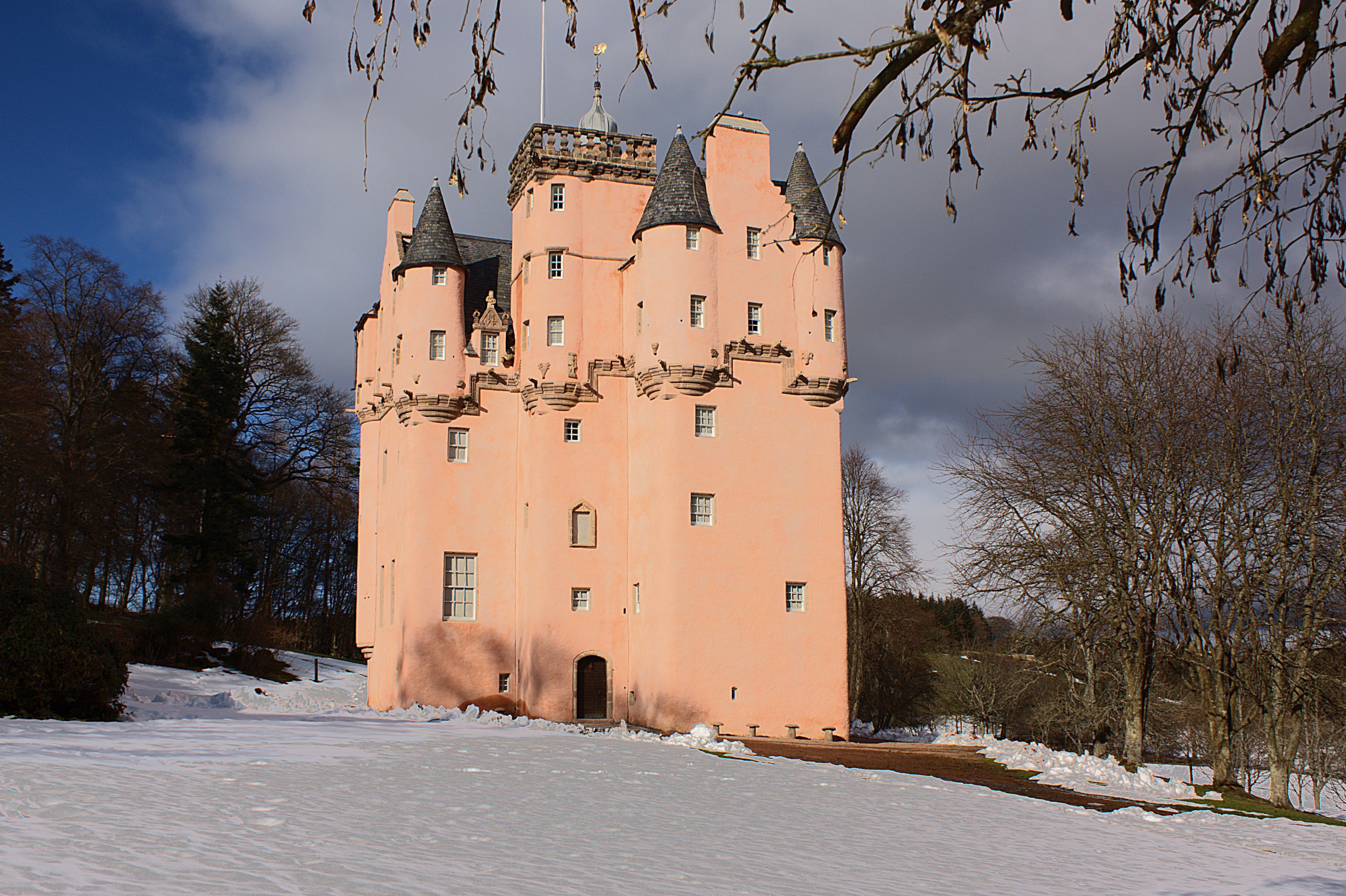
The castle, with new harling, in 2010

Between November 2007 and 2009, the castle was closed for its exterior to be given a new harl, returning it to what is believed to be a close equivalent of the harling put in place during the refurbishment of 1820. It was reopened to the public in April 2010. One report provided these specifics about the work and the state of the castle as of 2010:

The tower was renovated and rehabbed ... featuring a traditional lime-based alternative to concrete-based harling and returning the castle to what would have been its original shade of pink. The castle interior boasts a Great Hall that has the Stuart Arms over the fireplace; a musicians' gallery; a secret staircase connecting the high tower to the Great Hall; Queen's Bedroom; servants' quarters and several splendid plasterwork ceilings. The castle contains a collection of Forbes family portraits and furnishings dating to the 17th and 18th centuries.

No artificial lighting was ever added to the upper floors of the castle, so the artefacts would be viewed in the same natural light as they were during the previous centuries.

In 2019, a report provided this summary of the castle grounds:

Little remains of the 17th-century-designed landscape and the grounds around the Castle date from the late-18th and early-19th centuries. Further planting, particularly of ornamental conifers, was added at the end of the 19th century. In the 1930s a rock garden was created behind the coach house and, more recently, flower borders were added around the Castle and in the kitchen garden.

In early 2019, a volunteer discovered what is apparently the original door of the property, made of oak; it was replaced in 1825 and was considered to be missing until 2019. The door was subsequently restored and put on display.

By 2013, the castle, its grounds and an estate of over 200 acres (81 ha) of adjoining farmland and woodland were in their 50th year as a property of the National Trust for Scotland. Visits to the castle were allowed from Easter, or from the first of April (whichever is the earlier) until the end of September. In 2018, the castle was open between April and June, on Fridays to Tuesdays for guided tours; the grounds were open throughout the year. The site received 24,072 visitors in 2019. The National Trust continued to operate tours of the castle in 2019, but during 2020, the estate was closed due to the COVID-19 pandemic in the UK; upon reopening in July, visits were allowed only on the grounds for the rest of the season.

A September 2020 report states that the castle "holds a foremost place among the examples of what is known as the fourth or L period, from the form of ground plan upon which nearly all the Scottish castles of that date".

The castle was closed to visitors for about two years while the exterior was properly restored by National Trust for Scotland. The exterior was coated in limewash, the most effective coating over stone walls in the local climate. It reopened at the end of May 2024.

The castle relies on its windows for light, as there is no electricity in the rooms. The family had insisted in 1963 that the interiors not be changed, including artworks, decorative plaster work, panelling, and the lack of electricity for room lighting. The gift shop has a bit of electric lighting. Some members of the Forbes family, raised in the castle before the 1963 donation to Scotland, visit the castle in this decade of the 2020s. The exterior pink color was part of Aberdeen architect John Smith's 1826 makeover to "match the colour of the granite mouldings".

== In popular culture ==
The castle is reputed to have been the inspiration for Walt Disney's castle motif. This influence on Walt Disney for his pink Cinderella castle was confirmed by James Henderson of the National Trust for Scotland.

== Other sources ==
- Tranter, Nigel (1966), The Fortified House in Scotland, Volume IV, Oliver & Boyd
