= William Forbes-Sempill, 19th Lord Sempill =

Scottish lord, airman, and traitor (1893–1965)

The Right Honourable The Lord Sempill AFC
- Lord Sempill in 1946
- Born: William Francis Forbes-Sempill; 24 September 1893; Craigievar Castle, Aberdeenshire, Scotland
- Died: 30 December 1965 (aged 72); Edinburgh, Scotland
- Other name: Master of Sempill
- Education: Eton College
- Years active: 1914–1941
- Known for: Aviation, President of the Royal Aeronautical Society, spy, Sempill Mission
- Political party: Conservative
- Spouse(s): Eileen Lavery (m. 1919; died 1935) Cecilia Dunbar-Kilburn (m. 1941)
- Children: 5, including The 20th Lady Sempill
- Awards: Order of the Rising Sun; Order of the Polar Star

Member of the House of Lords Scottish representative peer
- In office 15 November 1935 – 31 July 1963

Member of the House of Lords Lord Temporal
- In office 31 July 1963 – 30 December 1965
- Preceded by: Seat established
- Succeeded by: The 20th Lady Sempill

William Francis Forbes-Sempill, 19th Lord Sempill, AFC, FRAeS, (24 September 1893 – 30 December 1965) was a Scottish peer and record-breaking air pioneer, who was later shown to have passed secret information to the Imperial Japanese military before the Second World War. Educated at Eton, he began his career as a pilot in the Royal Flying Corps, and then served in the Royal Naval Air Service and Royal Air Force during the First World War. In 1921, Sempill led an official military mission to Japan that showcased the latest British aircraft. In subsequent years, he continued to aid the Imperial Japanese Navy in developing its Navy Air Service.

In the 1920s, Sempill began giving military secrets to the Japanese. Although his activities were uncovered by British intelligence, Sempill was not prosecuted for spying and was allowed to continue in public life. He was eventually forced to retire from the Royal Navy in 1941, after being discovered passing on secret material to Tokyo shortly before Japan attacked Pearl Harbor and declared war on the United States and the British Empire.

Sempill was known as "Master of Sempill" before succeeding his father to the titles of Lord Sempill and Baronet of Craigevar in 1934.

== Early life ==
Born at the family seat of Craigievar Castle in Aberdeenshire, Sempill was educated at Eton, although in November 1907, having studied there for a year, he ran away, eventually making it to Craigievar before being discovered. Following this incident, he was privately tutored. In 1910, Sempill was apprenticed to Rolls-Royce.

In November 1913, Sempill offered his services to the Stackhouse Antarctic expedition, planned for the following year. He was supposed to serve as chief of the meteorological department, but with the outbreak of the First World War, the expedition was cancelled.

== Military and civil aviation ==
At the outbreak of war, Sempill joined Royal Flying Corps, being granted a probationary commission as a second lieutenant on 15 August 1914, which was confirmed less than four months later. In the meantime Sempill was appointed to flying duties. The following year, in February, Sempill took up a position as an "experimental officer" at the Central Flying School, and he received a promotion to lieutenant in April. Less than four months later he was appointed a flight commander with the temporary rank of captain. In August 1915, he was appointed to instructional duties. Sempill's time at the Central Flying School was not to last, as he relinquished his Army commission at the end of the year on being accepted for temporary service in the Royal Naval Air Service. Sempill's rapid rise through the ranks continued in the Navy, and at the close of 1916 he was promoted to squadron commander. On 1 April 1918, with the amalgamation of both flying services into the Royal Air Force, Sempill was transferred, and was appointed one of several deputy directors in the RAF's personnel department with the temporary rank of colonel. He was awarded the Air Force Cross in the 1918 Birthday Honours. Sempill stayed at the Air Ministry until 8 October 1918, when he was seconded to the Ministry of Munitions. On the cessation of hostilities, he became a test pilot, and he retired from military service in 1919.

On 4 September 1930, he set a new record by flying a de Havilland DH.80 Puss Moth seaplane (G-AAVB) 1,040 miles non-stop from Brent Reservoir in London to Stockholm, Sweden, in 12 hours. On 26 March 1936, he made a record-breaking flight in a BAC Drone ultra-light aircraft (G-ADPJ) 570 miles from Croydon Airport direct to Berlin Tempelhof Airport in 11 hours. He flew back a day or so later in 9 hours though he interrupted the flight with a stop at Canterbury, Kent.

In early 1931, Sempill was appointed chairman of National Flying Services, the government-subsidised owner and operator of London Air Park, Hanworth. On 22 March 1931, he hosted a visit by members of the Japanese Royal Family and the Japanese Ambassador to Britain. He arranged and hosted a widely publicised visit of the German airship LZ 127 Graf Zeppelin to Hanworth on 18 August 1931. On 2 July 1932, the airship returned as part of a round-Britain tour.He was chairman of the British Gliding Association 1933-1934

== Japanese spy ==
=== Beginnings ===
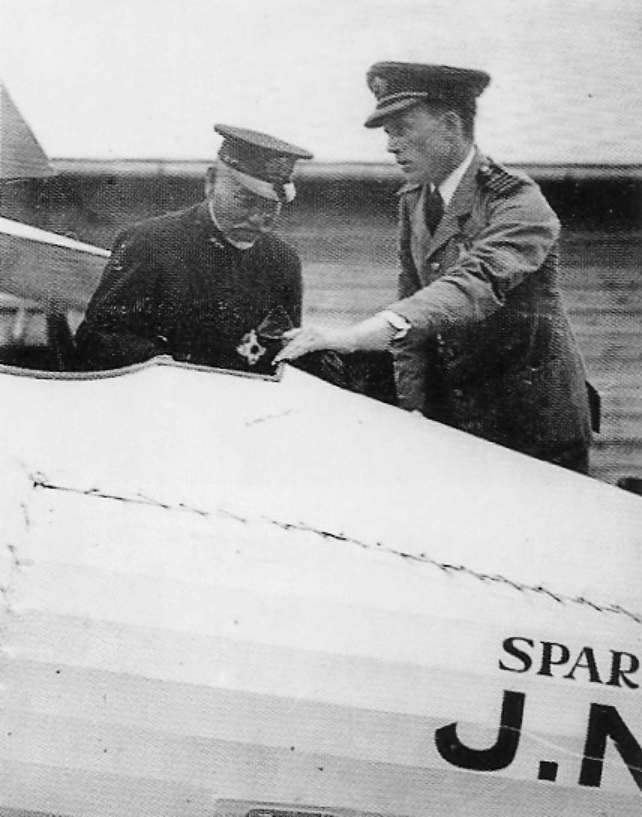
Capt. Sempill showing a Gloster Sparrowhawk to Admiral Count Tōgō Heihachirō, 1921

In 1920, he led a civilian British deputation of former naval airmen to Japan – the Air Ministry and the Foreign Office saw the prospect for lucrative arms contracts with Japan – to help develop aircraft carriers, and to assist the Japanese navy in setting up its new air base, after the Japanese had bought three Supermarine Channel flying boats. Sempill was well respected within Japanese circles, and received a personal letter from Prime Minister Tomosaburo Kato (1922–1923), thanking him for his work with the Imperial Japanese Navy, which he described as "almost epoch-making."

With the termination of the Anglo-Japanese Alliance in 1921, Sempill should have ended close military contact and discussions regarding naval aviation technology and tactics. However, on his return to the United Kingdom in 1923, Sempill kept in contact with the Japanese Foreign Ministry through the Japanese Embassy in London.

=== Suspicion and questioning ===
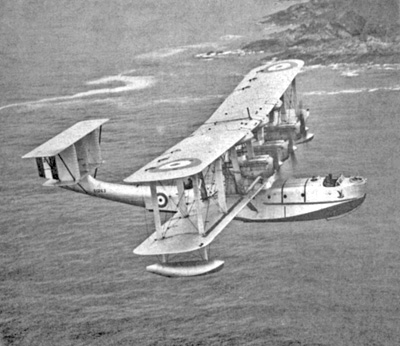
In 1925 Japanese intelligence asked Sempill to obtain secret technical information about the prototype of the Blackburn Iris seaplane.

In 1925, Sempill accompanied a mission of foreign air officials to the Blackburn Aircraft factory at Brough, East Yorkshire. The Japanese had previously asked questions about aircraft being developed. Sempill later asked the same questions, in his official capacity, about the then-secret Blackburn Iris.

The Directorate of Military Intelligence had kept Sempill's communications with the Japanese intelligence officer/Naval attaché in London, Captain Teijirō Toyoda, under surveillance from 1922. This led to the knowledge that Sempill was passing classified information to the Japanese that Toyoda's communications indicated had been paid for. MI5 tapped Sempill's phone, and observed that his servant was a Japanese naval rating.

In March 1926, Sempill was proposed by the Aviation Ministry for an appointment as Greece's aeronautical adviser. At this point, the Directorate of Military Intelligence advised the Foreign Office and the British Embassy in Athens that Britain could not be seen to endorse Sempill's appointment because of his past activities.

Sempill was called into the Foreign Office for questioning. The questions directed to him were intended to assess his loyalty to the British Government, his attachments to the Japanese, and the amount of information that he had passed to the Japanese. During the interrogation, the MI5 investigating officer could not reveal that the British had broken Japanese codes, and were monitoring the Japanese communications systems.

On a trip to Brough, Sempill had openly talked about the Iris flying boat with the foreign air officials on the train trip from London. This was witnessed by a British Air Ministry civil servant, who reported the incident. Upon being confronted with this information, Sempill admitted to the investigation officer that he had broken the Official Secrets Act.

A subsequent meeting, chaired by the Secretary of State for Foreign Affairs Austen Chamberlain, decided it was not in the interests of the British government to prosecute Sempill for violating the Official Secrets Act. Firstly, Sempill's father was then aide-de-camp to King George V; any public trial would be a grave embarrassment to both the Crown and the British establishment. Secondly, a prosecution would have revealed to the Japanese that British Intelligence had cracked the cypher codes of its diplomatic service.

=== Reprieve and inter-war activities ===
Six years after admitting he had breached the UK's Official Secrets Act, Sempill became a technical and business consultant to Mitsubishi Heavy Industries; from 1932 to 1936, he represented the Japanese company in Europe. He also became chairman and then president of the Royal Aeronautical Society. In this capacity, he advised overseas governments, such as Australia, on the creation of their naval air services.

In October 1933, Sempill was seriously injured in an accident while riding as a passenger in a prototype Dymaxion three-wheel car in the United States. Sempill had been invited, in his capacity as an aviation expert, to review the aerodynamic experimental vehicle at the Chicago World's Fair. As he was being rushed to an airport to catch a plane to Akron, Ohio, to meet the Graf Zeppelin for its return trip from New York to Europe, the Dymaxion was struck by another vehicle, and overturned, killing the driver and injuring Sempill.

On 28 February 1934, he succeeded his father, John Forbes-Sempill, 18th Lord Sempill, as Lord Sempill and Baronet of Craigevar. His wife Eileen, who had accompanied him on many of his air tours, died in July 1935.

Sempill had "an affinity with militarist right-wing regimes". During the 1930s, he developed extreme right-wing political opinions, and was active in several antisemitic organizations such as the Anglo-German Fellowship, the pro-Nazi Link organisation, and The Right Club led by Archibald Ramsay.

=== Espionage 1939–1941 ===
On the outbreak of war in 1939, Sempill was given a position in the Department of Air Materiel at the Admiralty. This gave him access to both sensitive and secret information about the latest British aircraft.

By June 1941, MI5 had intercepted messages between London and Mitsubishi and Marshal Yamagata's Tokyo headquarters indicating payments were being made to Sempill: "In light of the use made of Lord Sempill by our military and naval attaches in London, these payments should continue". On further investigation, MI5 suspected that Sempill was passing on top secret information about Fleet Air Arm aircraft. The matter was passed to the Attorney General and Director of Public Prosecutions. Once more, the Attorney General advised against prosecution. On 5 September 1941, Sempill attended a meeting with the Fifth Sea Lord, and was given "a strict private warning".

On Friday 2 August 1940, Special Branch arrested Japanese businessman Makihara Satoru, head of Mitsubishi Shoji Company's London office, and several others on suspicion of espionage, and took them to Brixton prison. On discovering that Makihara was in custody, Sempill telephoned and then called at Paddington police station to assure the police of Makihara's innocence and character. He was released a few days later, on Monday 5 August, due to "insufficient evidence".

Sempill was also probably passing on detailed information about the British government. In August 1941, Winston Churchill and President Franklin D. Roosevelt held a meeting in Newfoundland aboard HMS Prince of Wales to discuss the military threat posed by the Japanese. Soon after, communications between the Japanese embassy in London and Tokyo were deciphered by the Bletchley Park code breakers. The decrypted messages were transcripts of the conference notes. When passed to an alarmed Churchill, he called them "pretty accurate stuff". Three months later, more notes from Churchill's personal agenda and inner circle were intercepted as they were being sent by the Japanese Embassy in London to the Foreign Ministry in Tokyo. Privately, Churchill concluded with Anthony Eden that only two men could be the source of such leaks: Commander McGrath or Lord Sempill.

On 9 October 1941, a signed note from Churchill read: "Clear him out while time remains." The following week the Admiralty told Sempill he must either resign or be sacked.

After Sempill made an official protest, Churchill backtracked. The Prime Minister told the Admiralty: "I had not contemplated Lord Sempill being required to resign his commission, but only to be employed elsewhere in the Admiralty." A subsequent note from Churchill's aide Desmond Morton, dated 17 October 1941, outlined the new position: "The First Sea Lord ... proposes to offer him a post in the North of Scotland. I have suggested to Lord Swinton that MI5 should be informed in due course so they may take any precautions necessary."

On 13 December 1941, six days after the attack on Pearl Harbor, Sempill's office was raided. A search revealed secret documents that he should have handed back to the Admiralty over three weeks earlier. Two days later, Sempill was discovered making phone calls to the Japanese Embassy. Despite the evidence of treason in wartime (see Treachery Act 1940), no arrest or prosecution was ordered; Sempill agreed to retire from public office.

== Personal life ==
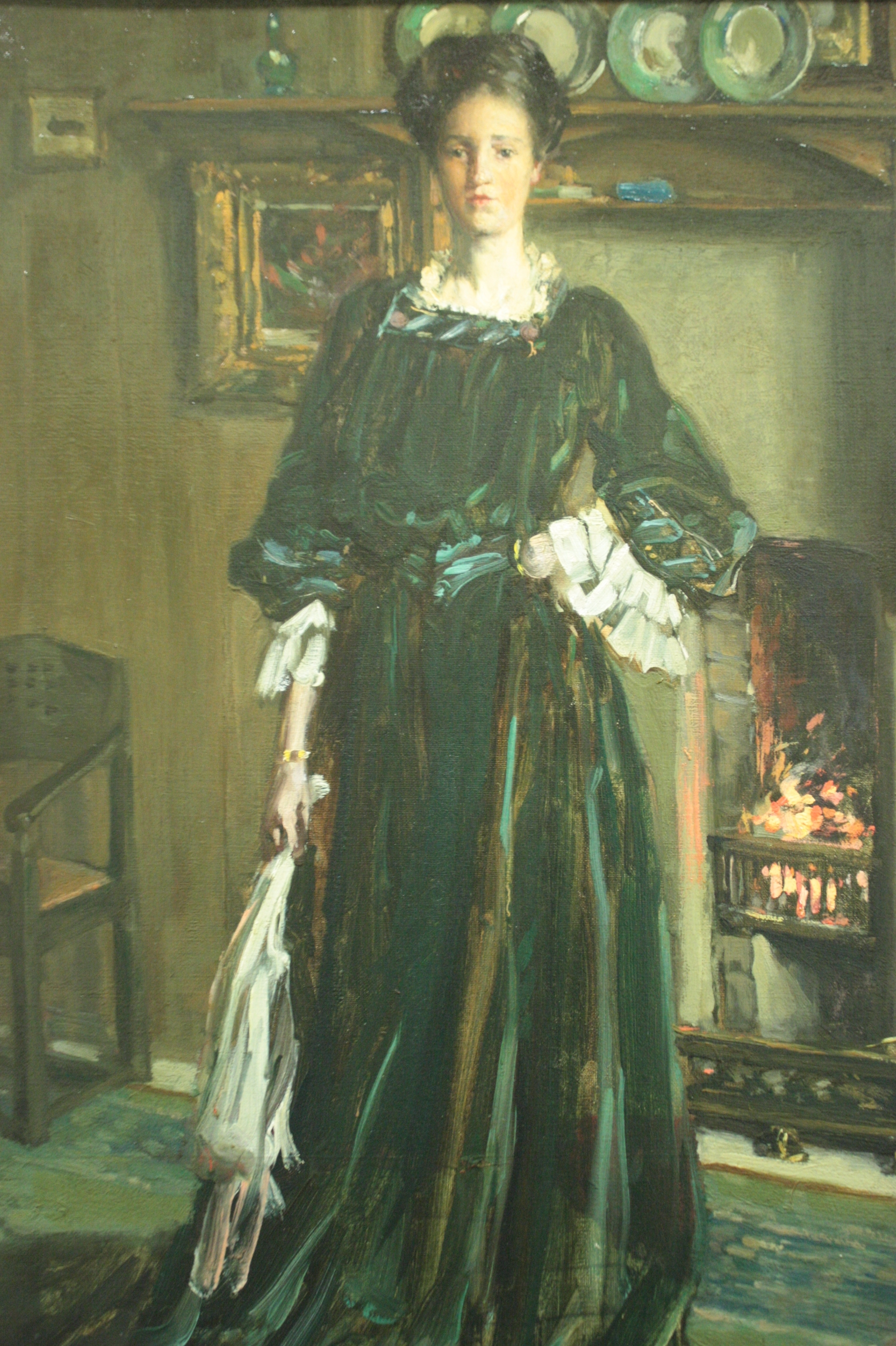
Eileen Lavery in 1913

In 1919, Sempill married Eileen Marion Lavery, (1890–1935) daughter of the Irish painter Sir John Lavery. He was her second husband, having divorced her first husband in Tangiers after having a daughter Diana with him. The Sempill's first daughter, Ann Moira, was born in 1920. Their second daughter, June Mary, was born in 1922, and was killed aged 18 as a result of enemy action on 11 May 1941 – the last day of the Blitz – at 15 Basil Street, London. She had been serving with the WVS Mobile Canteen Service. Six years after his wife's death from tuberculosis in 1935, Sempill remarried in 1941 to Cecilia Dunbar-Kilburn, a sculptor. They had three daughters, Kirstine Elizabeth, Janet Cecilia and Brigid Gabriel who married Jeremy Menuhin.

Sempill converted to Roman Catholicism in the early 1930s. He was also a druid and a Cornish bard.

== Later years and death ==
In 1944, Lord Sempill called on the Premier of Nova Scotia, Alexander Stirling MacMillan, in Halifax, and he offered to buy a part of the province. In 1956, the Swedish government awarded him the Order of the Polar Star. At various times he was president of the British Gliding Association and of the Institute of Advanced Motorists. In 1963, he sold Craigievar Castle to the National Trust for Scotland.

He died in Edinburgh on 30 December 1965. His daughter, Ann, inherited the Sempill peerage, as it was one that could be passed to a female heir. However, the baronetcy, which could only be inherited in the male line, passed to his younger sibling, Ewan Forbes, who had been registered at birth and raised as female, but lived as a man, and had his birth re-registered as male. This inheritance was challenged on grounds of sex by a cousin, John Forbes-Sempill, but upheld in the courts.

== Legacy ==
It was not until the release of intelligence records by the Public Record Office in 1998 and 2002 that Sempill's activities as a spy during the war and in the 1920s respectively became common knowledge. Sempill's motives and activities, as well as accusations of spying, are still a subject of academic debate.

Sempill's motives remain unclear. The National Archives states that "on the evidence of these [1920s] files", Sempill's activities on behalf of the militaristic Japanese and Fascist contacts were less from any desire to help the enemy but more motivated by his own impetuous character, obstinacy, and flawed judgement.

In correspondence of the early 1940s, between Churchill's office, the Attorney General and the Director of Public Prosecutions, it is observed that Sempill had debts and an overdraft in excess of £13,000 (equivalent to £750,000 in 2012).

== Honours and arms ==
- Air Force Cross (AFC)
- 3rd Class of Commander in the Order of the Rising Sun, Japan.
- Order of the Polar Star, Sweden.

=== Coat of arms ===
Coat of arms of William Forbes-Sempill, 19th Lord Sempill
Coronet A coronet of a Baron Crest 1st, a stag’s head argent, attired with ten tynes azure, collared with a prince’s crown or; 2nd, A cock proper. Escutcheon Quarterly: 1st and 4th argent, a chevron checky gules and of the field, between three hunting horns sable, garnished and stringed of the second, (Sempill); 2nd and 4rd azure, a cross patée fitchée or, between three bear’s heads couped argent, muzzled gules, (Forbes of Craigievar). Supporters Two greyhounds argent, collared gules. Motto 1st Keep Tryst; 2nd Watch.

== See also ==
- Frederick Rutland, British naval aviator and Japanese spy
- John Semer Farnsworth, American naval officer and Japanese spy

Professional and academic associations
Preceded by Sir William Sefton Brancker	President of the Royal Aeronautical Society; 1927-1930	Succeeded by Charles Richard Fairey
Peerage of Scotland
Preceded by John Forbes-Sempill	Lord Sempill; 1934–1965	Succeeded by Ann Forbes-Sempill
Baronetage of Nova Scotia
Preceded by John Forbes-Sempill	Baronet (of Craigievar); 1934–1965	Succeeded by Ewan Forbes
