= Lowes Loch (Ayrshire) =

Lake in the United Kingdom

Coordinates: 55°46′2.1″N 4°35′15.7″W

Lowes Loch or The Lochs
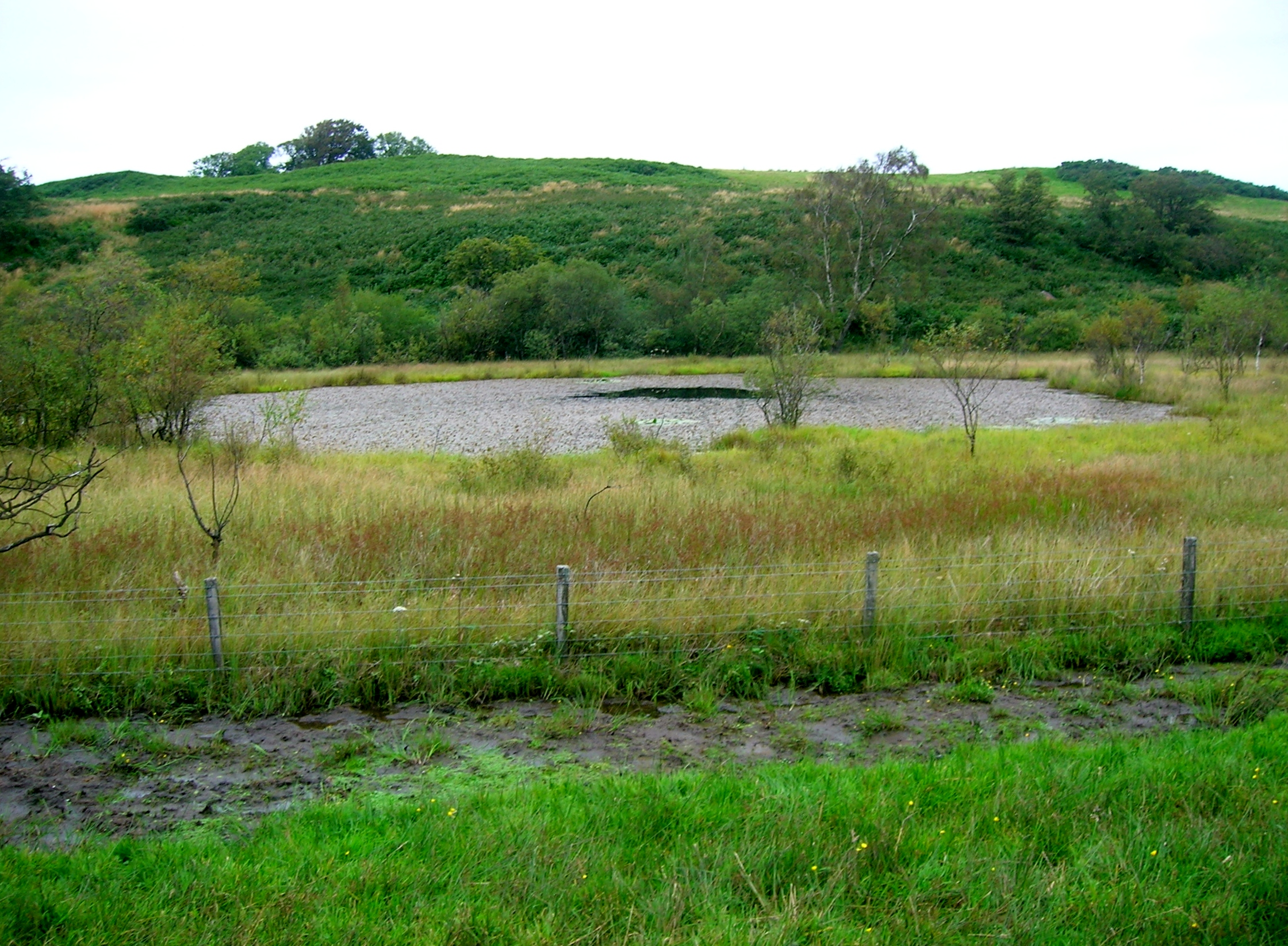
- Lowes loch from near the Lochlands Farm site

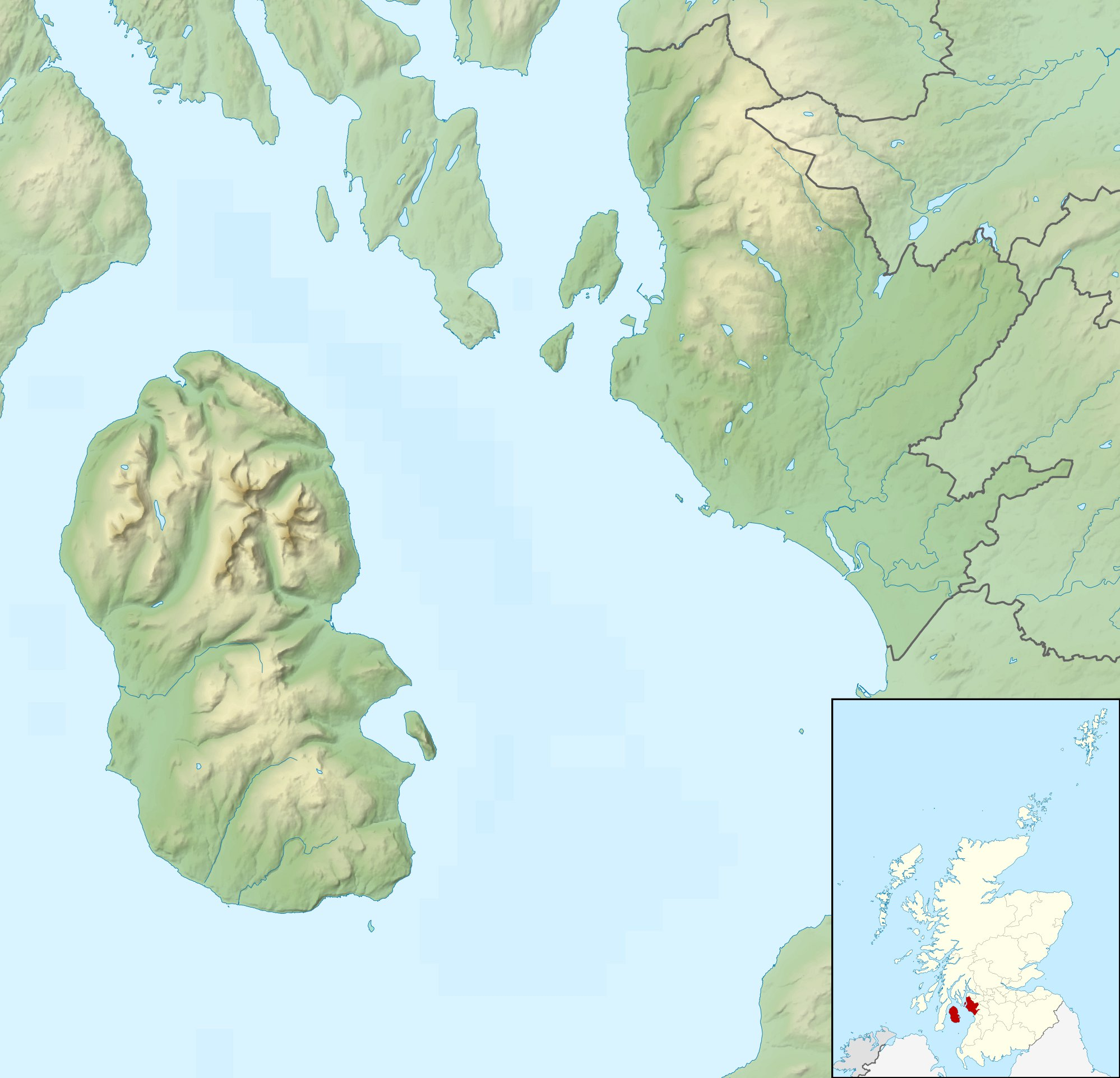
- Location within North Ayrshire
- Location: Beith, North Ayrshire, Scotland
- Type: Freshwater loch
- Primary inflows: Cadgerford and Lochlands Burns, field drainage, and rainfall
- Primary outflows: Cadgerford Burn running to the Dusk Water
- Basin countries: Scotland
- Islands: 1
- Settlements: Beith

Lowes Loch, The Lochs (NS 37754 55688) or Loch of Hill is now a small natural freshwater loch in the North Ayrshire Council Areas (KA15 2JR), Scotland, lying in a glacial kettle hole, once of greater extent, lying below Brownmuir and Lochland Hills on the Threepwood Road, near Beith, in the Parish of Beith. The loch may once have had a small island within it.

== Lochs site ==
Marked on Ordnance Survey maps as "The Lochs", it was locally known as the Lowes Loch and lies on the old "Lowes Lands". Four lochs may have once been present, a small one in front of Lows Cottage, a second along to the west of the surviving loch, and a smaller fourth one, now partly drained by a deep ditch, sitting next to the older of the two Lochlands Farms ruins. Before the Cadgerford Burn was deepened the lochs level would have been higher and may have once drained to the west and east.

Lows Cottage

This building was originally a retting cottage, later becoming a small farm with a byre attached.

Cartographic evidence

Blaeu's map of 1684, pbased on Timothy Pont's map of circa 1604, names a "Loch of Hill" and Roy's map of circa 1747 shows two small lochs, with the outflow of the western loch running down to the Muir Burn and then into the Roebank Burn. Thomson's map of 1832 shows a single loch lying below Lows Farm and draining east into the Dusk water. OS maps of the 1850s do not indicate open water and a discreet clump of trees suggests a small island.

The abandoned Rakerfield Farm lies above the site on the lower slopes of Brownmuir or Brimmer Hill. This farm was occupied by the elderly couple, Mrs & Mrs Blair, at the time of the construction of Kirklee Green reservoir and was purchased upon their death by Ayrshire County Council and the roof removed.

Cadgerford Burn

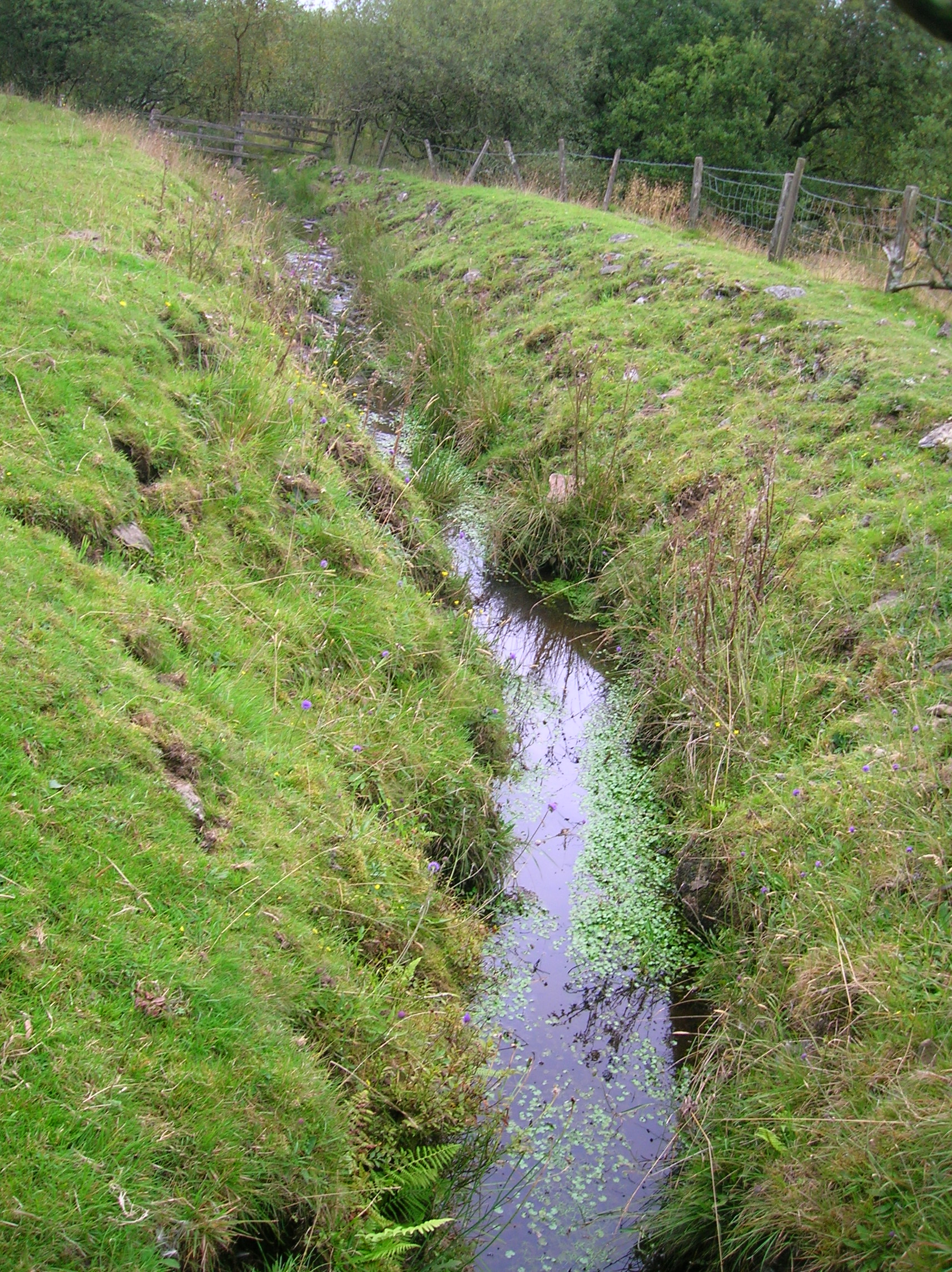
The Cadgerford Burn

The name of the inflow and outflow burn indicates, as stated, a ford on this old road once used by cadgers or carriers on horseback of goods, including items such as Dunlop cheeses. The burn is the existing inflow and outflow from Lowes Loch to the Dusk Water; it has been canalised and greatly deepened to lower the level of Lowes Loch. The burn now flows into the Kirkleegreen Reservoir, built after 1858 and by 1891. The waters of this old reservoir, now an angling loch, run into Cuffhill Reservoir and then into the Dusk Water via Threepwood Spout. The ford may have been where a culvert now carries the outflow of the small loch in front of Lows Cottage down towards Lowes Loch.

Beith's annual fair, called Tennant's or Saint Tinnan's Day, was previously held on the Cuff Hill. It was famous for its show, and its Cadger's parade and sale of horses.

== Uses ==
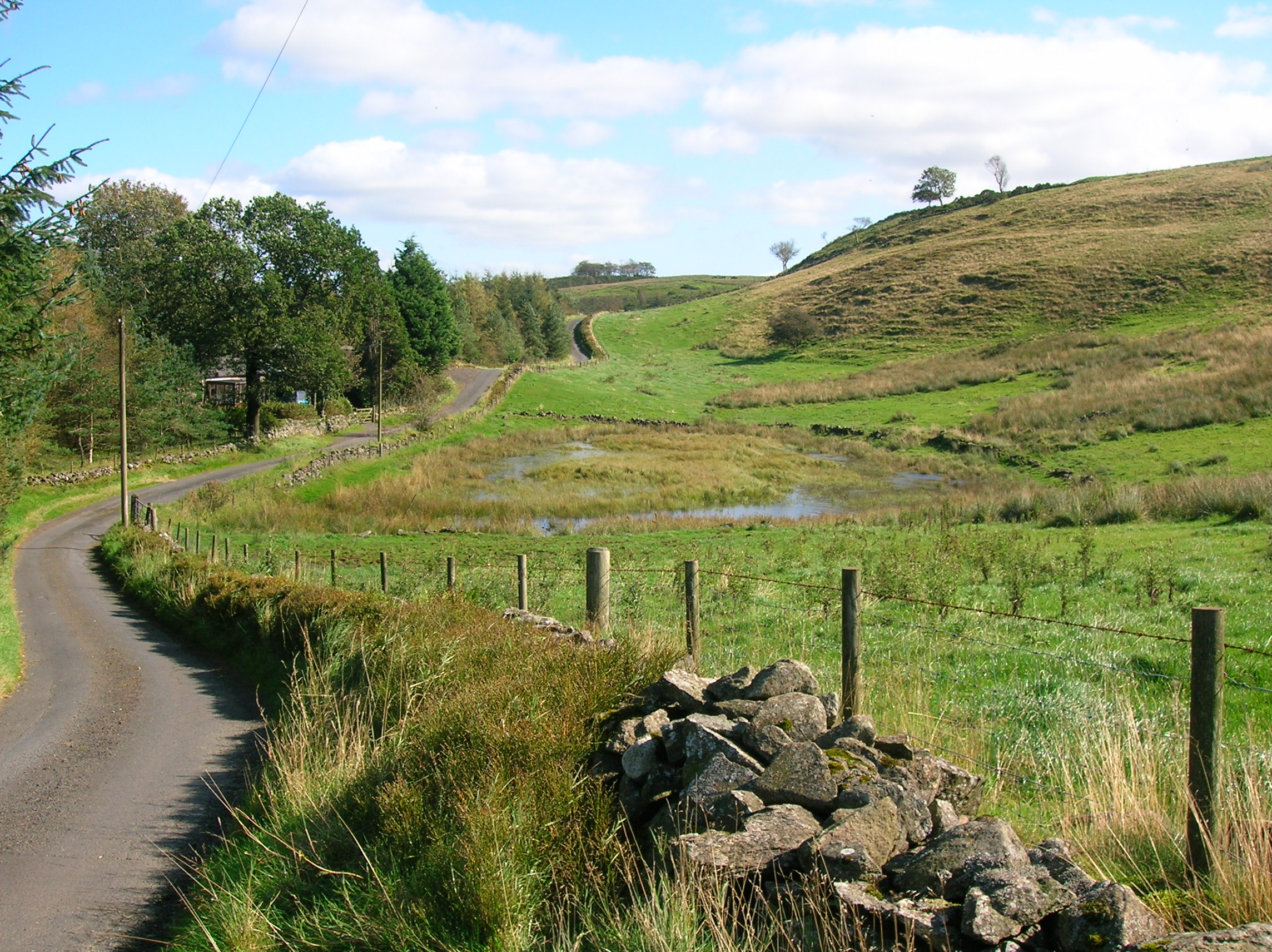
Old retting pond a Lows Cottage

Flax retting

The lochan in front of Low Cottage was a retting pond and the cottage was built as a retting cottage for the preparation of flax. The loch no longer has any open water. Retting is the process of taking off the outer part of flax by laying flax in water.

Thomson's map of 1832 and the OS maps show that the loch flowed via the Cadgerford Burn into the millpond of the old Threepwood Bleach and Dye works below Cuff Hill and thus helped to power the factory's waterwheel. Since at least 1891 the waters of the loch have flowed into the Kirkleegreen and Cuffhill Reservoirs.

=== Davie's o'the Mill ===
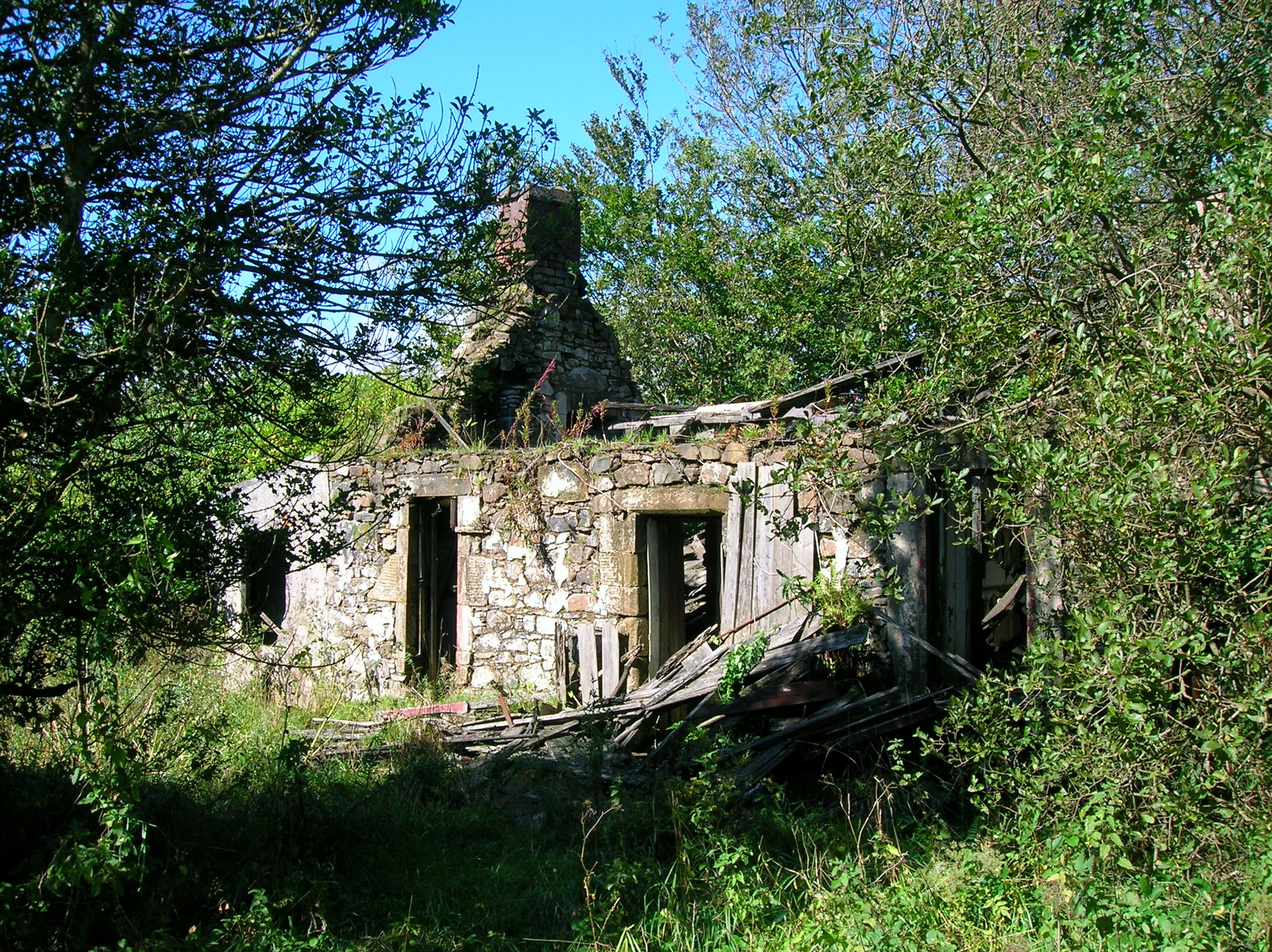
Davie's o'the Mill ruins in 2011

Davie's o'the Mill is a probably an old flax mill associated with the retting cottage and possibly the bleach and dye works at Threepwood. The Davie's o'the Mill ruins lie nearby, once powered by a burn that runs down from the Saint Inan's well site and at one time the westward flow from the Lowes Lochs prior to the canalising of the Cadgerford Burn. A right of way still runs down to the site from near Cauldhame Cottage and a lane runs up to the old mill from near Mill o'Beith and the Warlock Craigie. Lying quite close to Loanhead Quarry the steading is now a ruin (2011).

Dugald Semple, vegetarian and the "Scottish apostle of the simple life", lived at Davie's o'the Mill from the 1930s until around 1950, when it was a smallholding. Dugald was a hippy before hippies officially existed. He travelled widely to healthy living conferences in Norway, USA and elsewhere and died in Edinburgh aged 79. A regular visitor to Ailsa Craig, he was known locally as the "Bird Man" and was an enthusiast for outdoor living, publishing a book entitled A Free Man's Philosophy. He welcomed walkers and cyclists who often camped on his land.

== Natural history ==
The relatively small area of open water is dominated by floating pondweeds (Potamogeton sps), and has some water lilies Nuphar lutea. The Common Hawker or Sedge Darner (Aeshna juncea) breeds at the site. An extensive woodland of willow and birch extends towards Lowhouse Farmlands. Extensive areas of rushes (Juncus sps) are present.

== Lochlands Farms ==
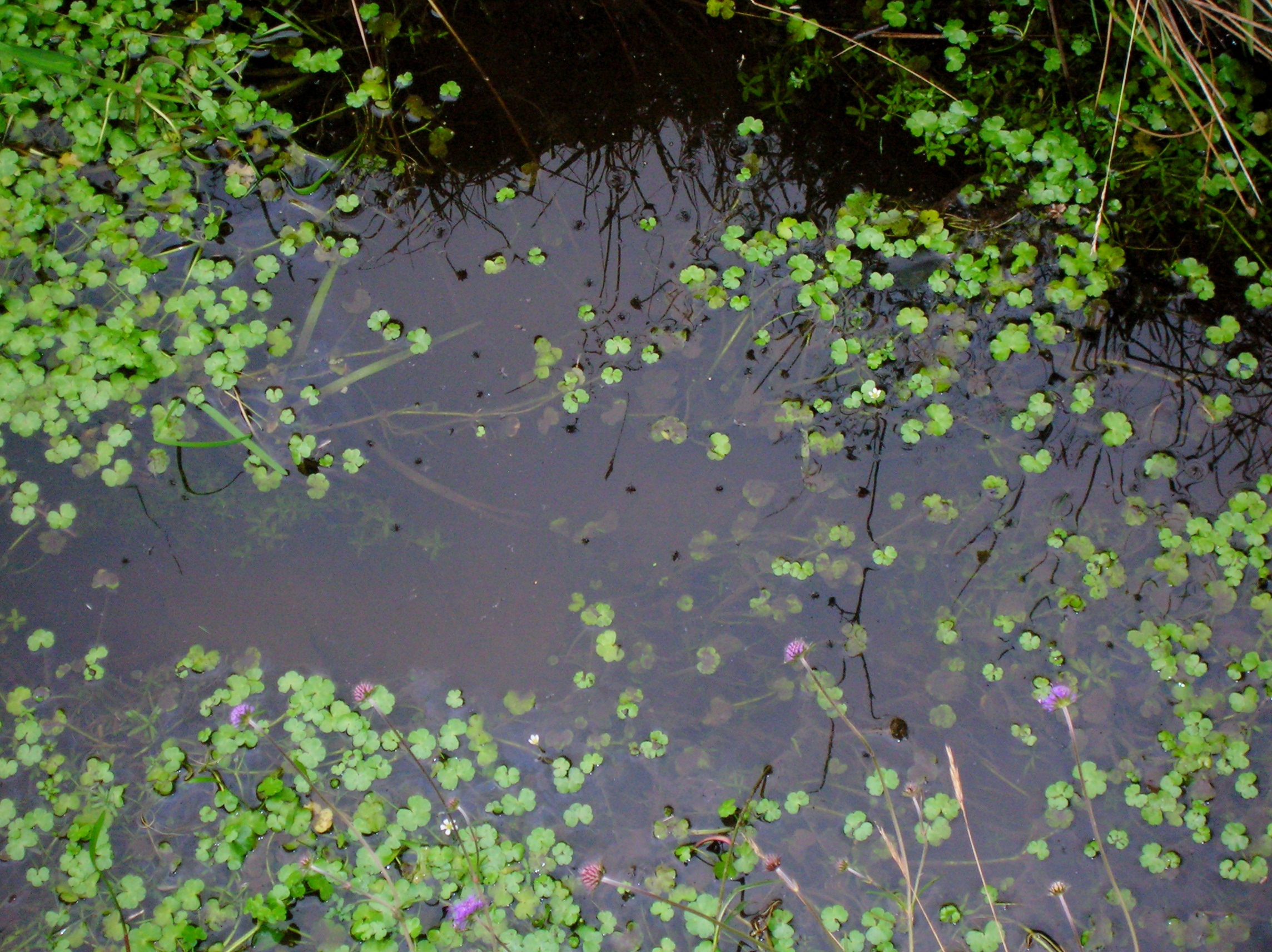
Marsh Pennywort in the Cadgerford Burn

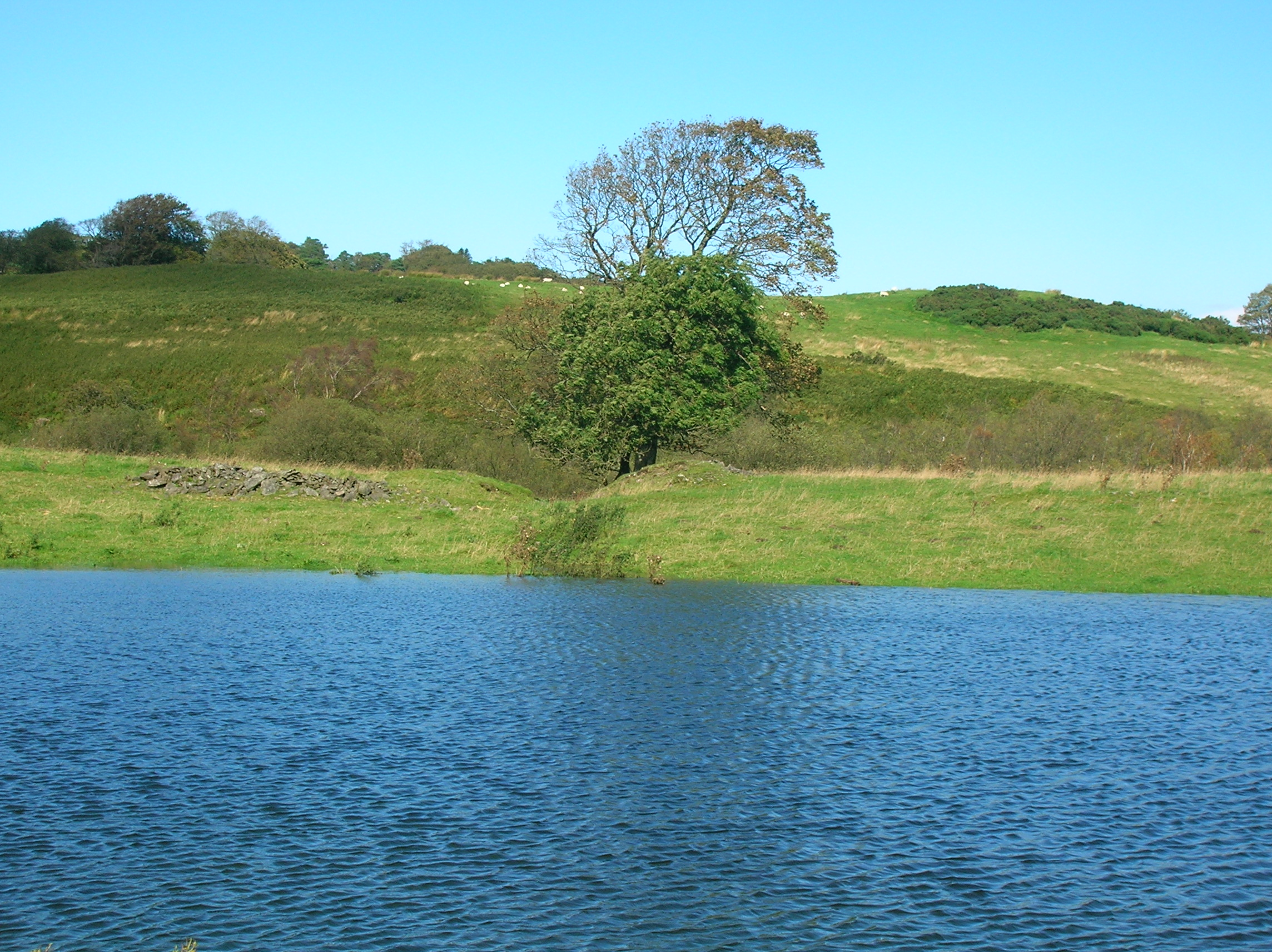
Seasonal lochan at Lochlands and the drainage ditch

A small building, marked as a ruin in 1856 and now entirely absent, with its own entrance and sheep fauld, sat within woodland in line with the small loch and later substantial drainage ditch feature that runs down to the main loch. The larger Lochlands Farm (NS378555) buildings lay closer to the road a little further back from the Lowes Loch. It has been abandoned since before the 1950s, shown as active in 1914 from the record of the OS map. A photograph of the early 1900s shows a substantial and unusual design for a farm building; L-shaped and 'Council House' like in appearance. The OS map shows that this later building had an orchard or ornamental garden and was more of a dwelling than a farm, being occupied by a family who owned the Cunningham bus company in Paisley which became part of Western SMT. It was demolished as part of precautions intended to prevent any possible contamination of the reservoir water.

In 1956 it is recorded that a Mr. Newall found a stone slab built into the ruin of Lochlands, presumably the more modern building, bearing a carved circle, 15ins in diameter, containing a simple cross with one arm extended to represent the shaft. This ancient stone cross may relate to the nearby site of Kirklee Green with its obvious religious links. It has not been seen since 1956. A small ruin was located to the west of Lochlands on the edge of a now drained lochan which is a candidate for the chapel site and the site of the aforementioned cross.

A small church may have been built here, possibly at the site of the original small Lochlands building, which stood on the bank of a small loch, to "counteract" the many pagan sites located at Cuff Hill, such as the lost Druid's Stone Circle, the Druids' Graves or Caves (a long barrow), the now destroyed Four Stones, a standing stone, etc. The name Cuff itself has been interpreted as meaning Druid or Priest. Saint Inan's Well and Chair are close by and one of the hills in the area, marked as Krelig Hill, was once topped by a cross.

The location of The Lowes Loch, North Ayrshire

== Micro-history ==
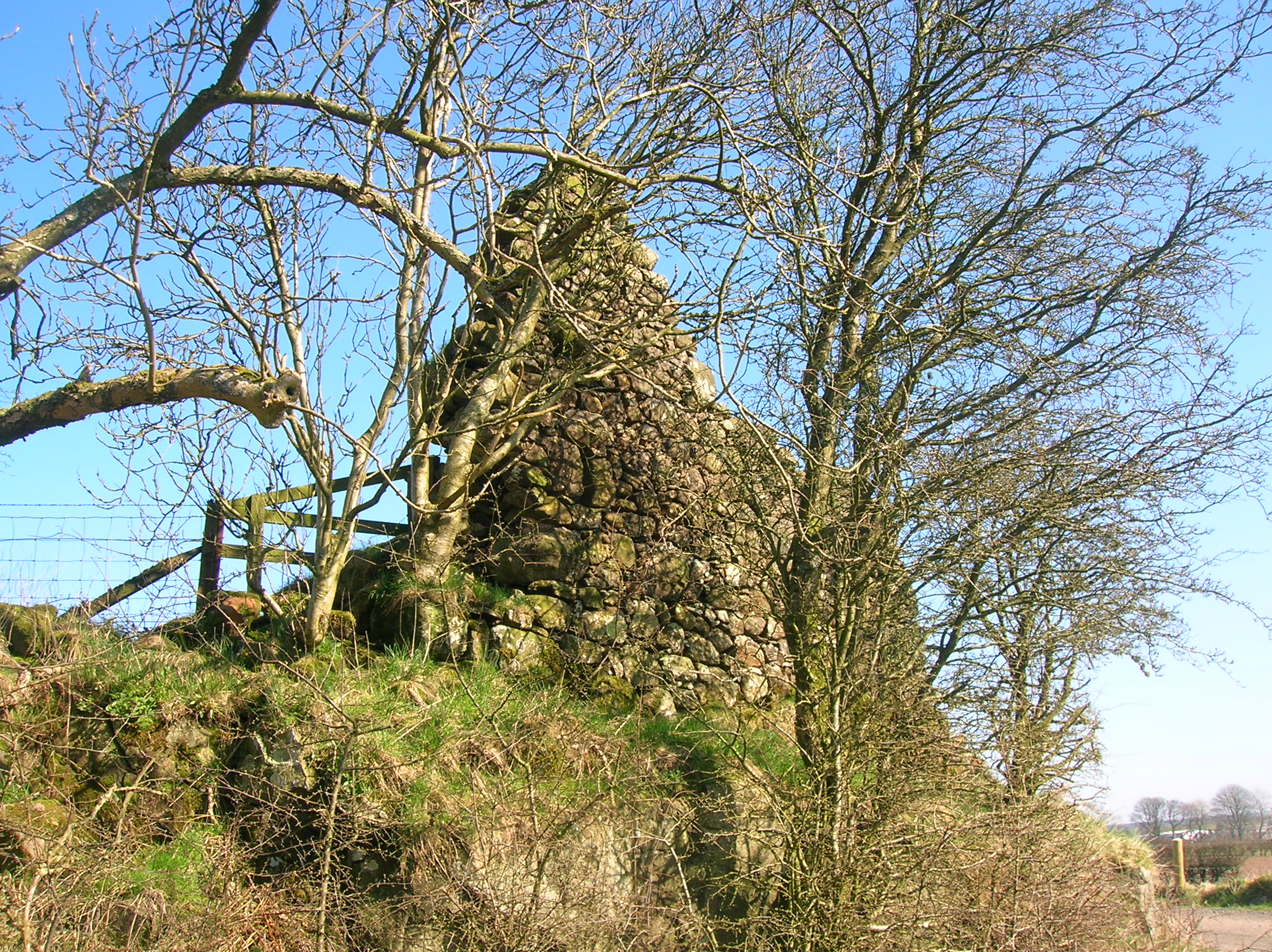
Ancient ruins overlooking Lowes near the old Threepwood estate

It has been speculated that the Cuff Hill range was the Moor of Beith, and that this moor is the same as the "Wood of Belt" in which, at the close of the day, a battle, supposed to have taken place in the latter half of the sixth century.

Curling stones were produced at a site near Kirklee Green Reservoir for a number of years in the 19th century and it is said that a considerable number were used in the construction of the reservoir's dam.

An old cheese press stone is located outside Low Cottage.

Cuff Hill Lochan

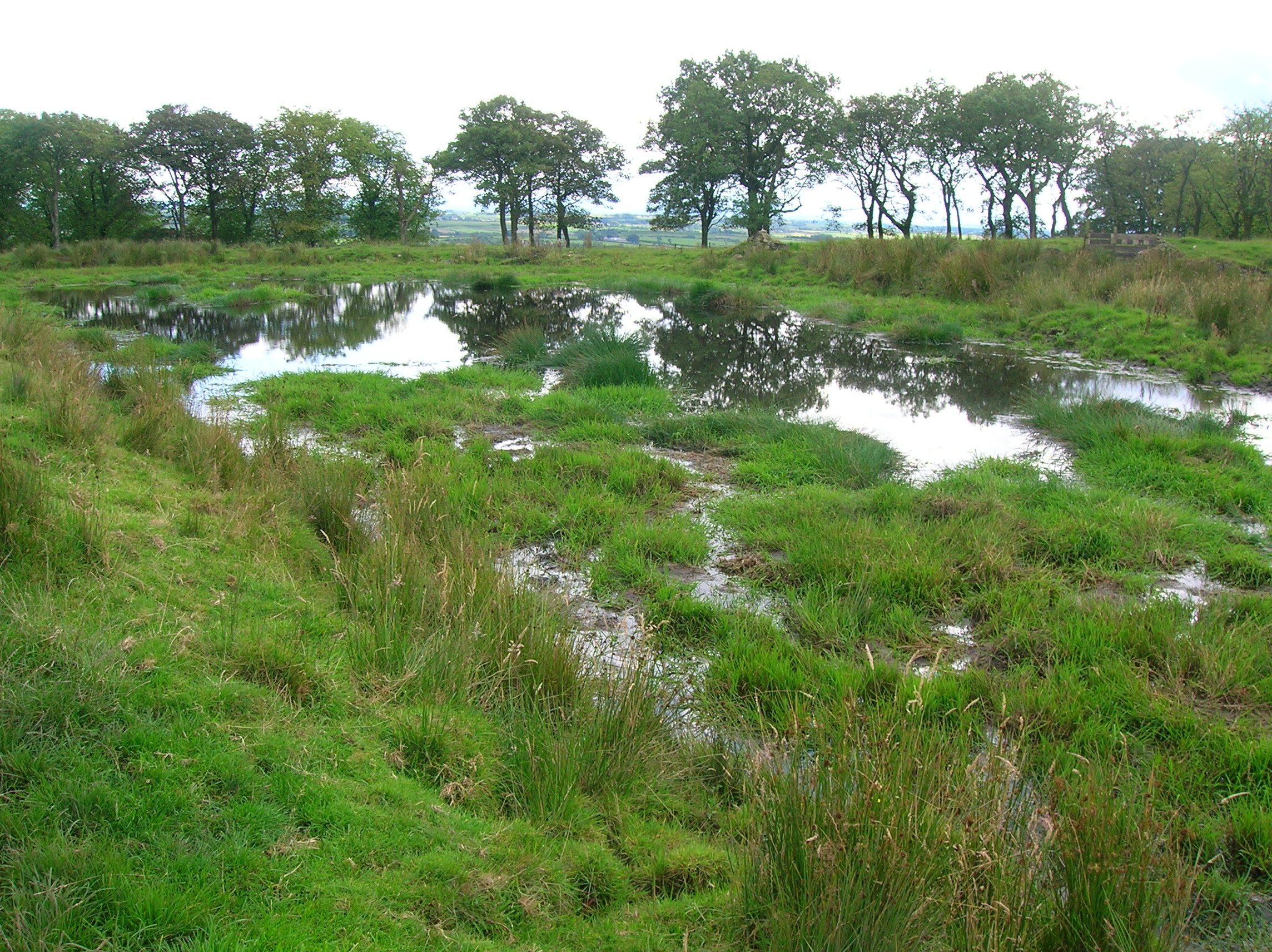
The Cuff Hill Lochan

This small lochan (0.214 acres) is located on the south-facing slopes of Cuff Hill and may be artificial, as suggested by the number of old whinstone quarries in the vicinity. It is marked on the 1858 OS map and was deepened and modified for use as a reservoir, with a sluice and filter bed, probably once serving The Cuff Farm below it. The site is rich in wildlife, including Common Hawker dragonflies. The rare climbing corydalis Ceratocapnos claviculata grows amongst gorse nearby.
