= Lands of Threepwood =

- Beith, North Ayrshire, Scotland; UK grid reference NS393558
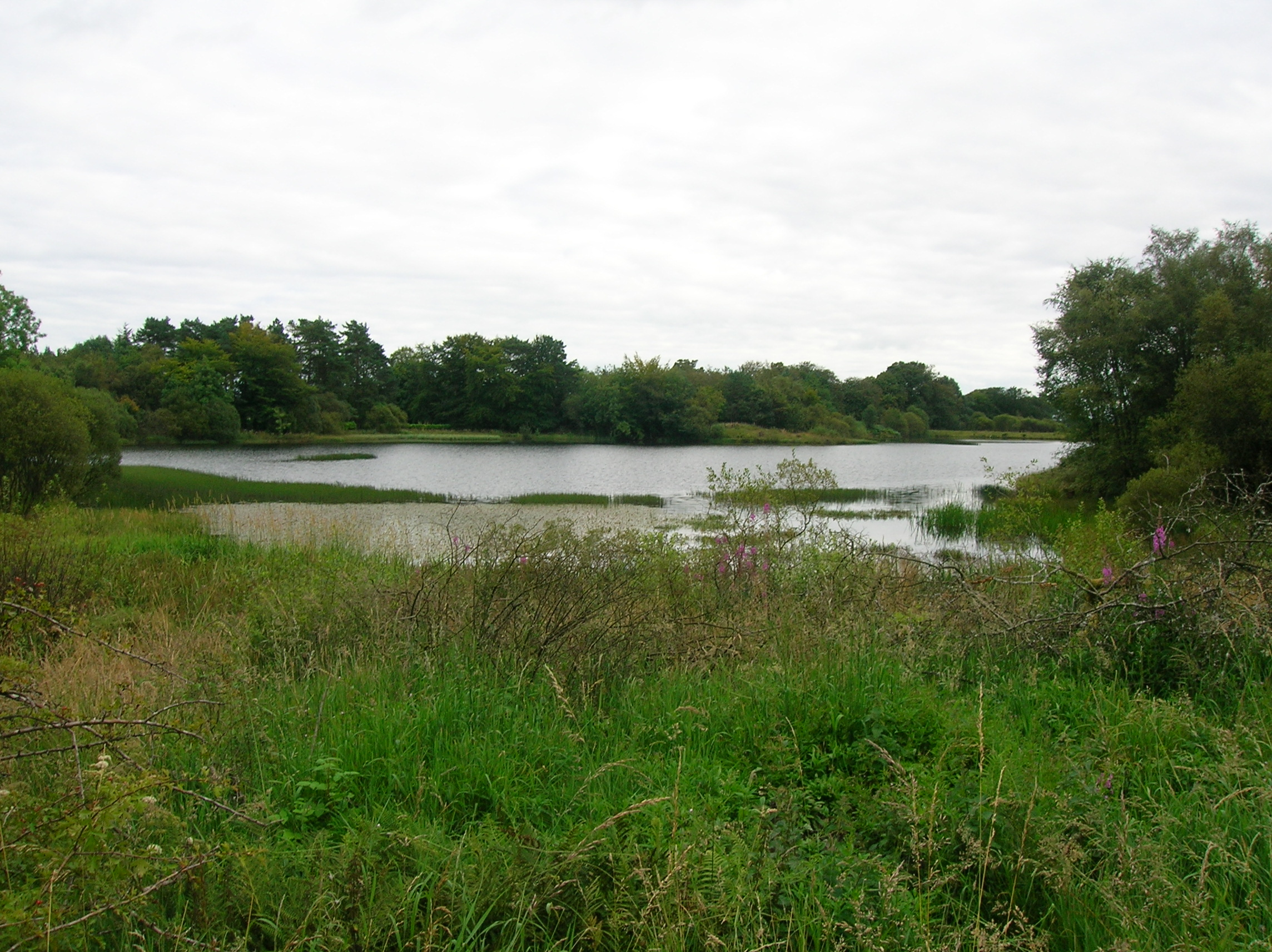
- Cuffhill Reservoir from the site of the old Threepwood Bleach Works.

Site information
- Type: Laird's dwelling and estate
- Owner: Private
- Controlled by: Montgomerie
- Open to the public: No
- Condition: Incorporated into a farm

Location
- Shown within Scotland
- Location within Scotland
- Coordinates: 55.76909°N 4.563425°W
- Grid reference: NS 39287 55820

Site history
- Built: 18th century
- Built by: Love family
- Materials: Stone

The lands of Threepwood were located in the Parish of Beith, at the eastern boundary between East Renfrewshire and North Ayrshire, Scotland. The settlements of Midtown, Townhead and Townend were part of the old Threepwood Estate. Cuffhill at 675 feet is the highest eminence in the parish and it overlooks the area with Little Hill and Cuff Hill and Little Hill plantations nearby, now situated next to the entirely artificial Cuffhill Reservoir.

== History of the lands of Threepwood ==
The name 'Threepwood', 'Thriepwood' or 'Threppe-wood' may derive from the Scots term 'Threap-wood' meaning a piece of woodland the ownership of which was disputed and found in Ayrshire as a place name. In Scottish history the term Threaplands referred to the Debatable Lands on the Scottish-English border.

=== The Lairds ===
Avice de Morville, wife of Richard de Morville and daughter of William de Lancaster, Baron of Kendal, gave the lands of Threppe-wood to Kilwinning Abbey in the 12th century. The lands in 1556 were leased by Gavin Hamilton, Commendator of Kilwinning Abbey, to Adam Hamilton of Holmhead. In 1557 Adam passed the lease to John Hamilton of Stanehouse for "thirteen score of merks, thirty bolls seeds oats, six bolls of bere, four oxen and a brown horse" and a few months later John obtained a feu that passed the lands to the family in perpetuity for an annual payment. In 1574 John passed the lands to his son James. In 1633 James Hamilton sold the lands to Robert Luiff or Love.

Threepwood House

The Loves previously held the name McKinnon and in 1613 a James Luiff appears to have lived at Threepwood judging from a stone at Threepwood that is inscribed 'I.L. & B.S. 1613' for James Luiff and Barbara Stewart. This Barbara may have been a close relation of Matho Stewart, a tenant of Threepwood under the abbacy's control. The surname Love originated from the word for wolf, 'Luef' in French, and 'Lufe' or Luiff in the Scots language.

Robert Love may have been their son and is described as being 'portioner of Threepwood' as he sold or sub-feued Townend Farm to Thomas Fulton and Midtoun or Mid Town to William Anderson. James Love, his son, married Barbara Stewart of Risk in Lochwinnoch parish in 1652 as recorded on a stone inscribed 'J.L. & B.S. 1652' and inherited the remaining lands of Threepwood in 1649. Robert Love of Threepwood the younger inherited in 1693-94 and married in 1690 an Agnes Stevenston from Bra-Haugh near Neilston and another marriage stone at Threepwood records this. In 1734 another Robert Love was born to James Love and Jean Robison of Wardyett and he inherited from his grandfather in 1769 as his father had died in 1743. The last named Robert had a son of the same name who married twice, first to Janet Cochrane of Millthird and secondly to Jean Connell of South Castlewalls.

John Love was born in 1781 and was man of some importance, being a Commissioner of Supply, a Justice of the Peace and a Road Trustee. He purchased the lands of 'Tower of Auchenbathie, 'New Mill of Auchengown Stewart' and those of Netherhill near Dunlop. John married Jean Fulton of Sproulston. Their eldest son Robert was a writer in Lochwinnoch who married Mary Hunter Carswell of Reivoch in 1844 and had an only daughter Mary Hunter Carswell Love.

== Threepwood ==
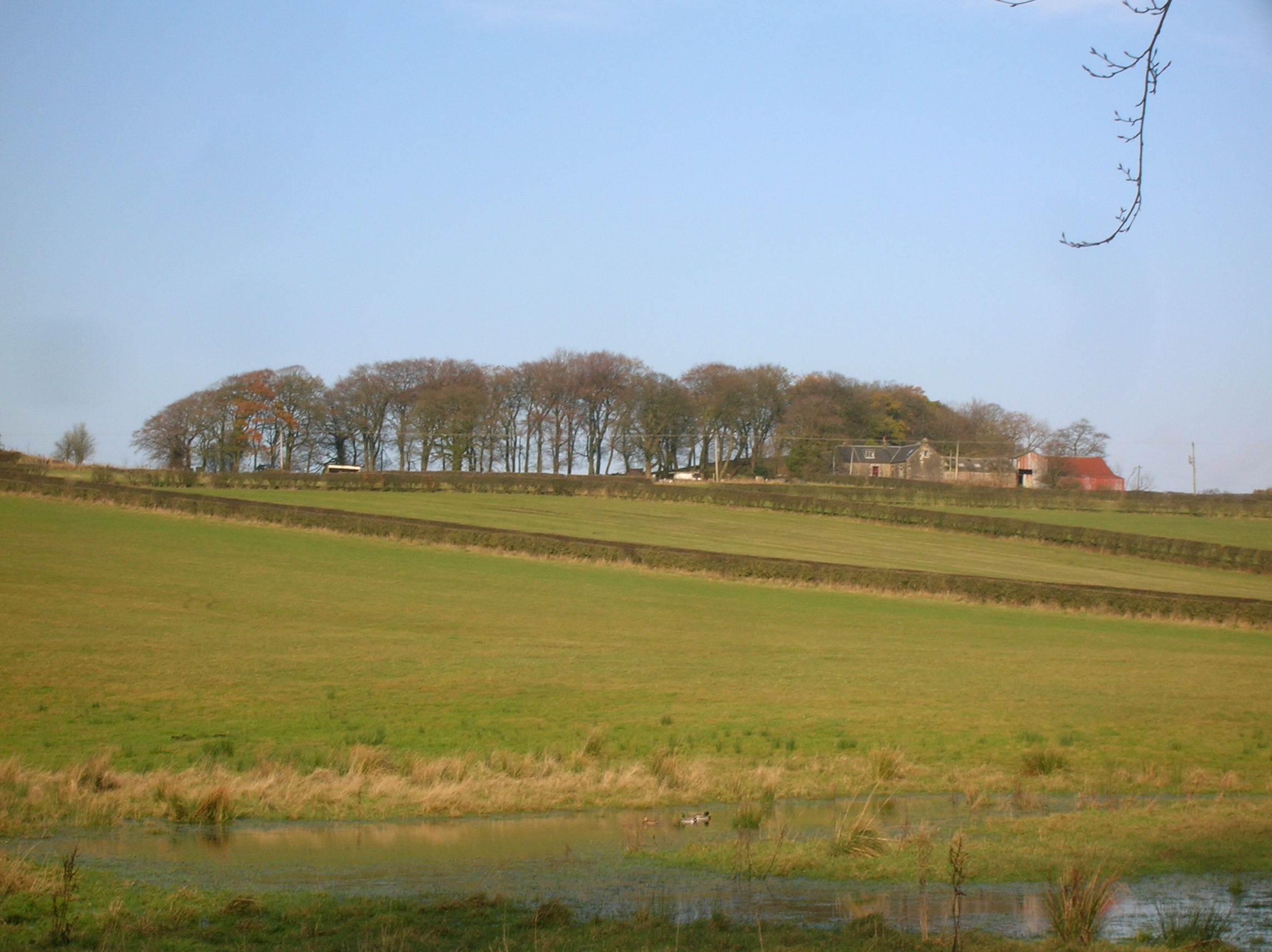
Threepwood Farm

The lands of Threepwood lay in the Barony of Beith, Regality of Kilwinning and Bailiary of Cunninghame. The lands may have once reached as far as the Barrcraigs as the Cross of Brakraigs (sic) is shown on Blaeu's map suggesting that Kilwinning Abbey's lands extended to this point. The march or boundary to the east was with the Barony of Auchinbathie, to the west were the lands of Auchingown Stewart and Brownmuir (Brimmer); to the south-west those of Hessilhead and to the south the march was the lands of Shutterflat.

Roy's military map of 1747-55 shows a settlement named Townhead and another named Middletown but no mention of Threepwood. Armstrong's map of 1775 marks Threepwood and shows two settlements that correspond in position to those recorded by Roy. John Ainslie's 1821 map marks Threepwood and also a Townhead. Thomson's 1832 map shows a laird's style dwelling of Threepwood and a group of two buildings below, also marked as Threepwood, with a lane running between. In 1828 'Bleachfield' is recorded with two separate buildings, one next to a millpond on the Cadgerford Burn and the other next to the Dusk Water.

The three 'Towns' of Threepwood looks to have been the typical 'ferm toun' settlement arrangement such as at Hessilhead, the origin of which lies in the common medieval sub-division of land called a ploughgate (104 acres), the extent of land which one plough team of oxen could till in a year. This area was again subdivided into four husbandlands, each of 26 acres (110,000 m^{2}). Each husbandland could provide two oxen and eight oxen were need for a plough-team. This arrangement led to small farm towns being established with accommodation for at least four men in six to eight houses, taking practical considerations into account. Another similar 'ferm toun' also existed at Bloak, near Auchentiber, until the 1890s.

=== Threepwood House ===
First shown as a 'Laird's' house in 1832, by 1858 Threepwood House is shown above Mid Town as a substantial group of buildings with a square ornamental garden with internal paths lying in a walled garden immediately to the west of the house. An older house has had byres and other outbuildings built to transform the house into a farm. Substantial woodland policies were planted nearby with Tandle Hill nearby.

=== Mid Town of Threepwood ===
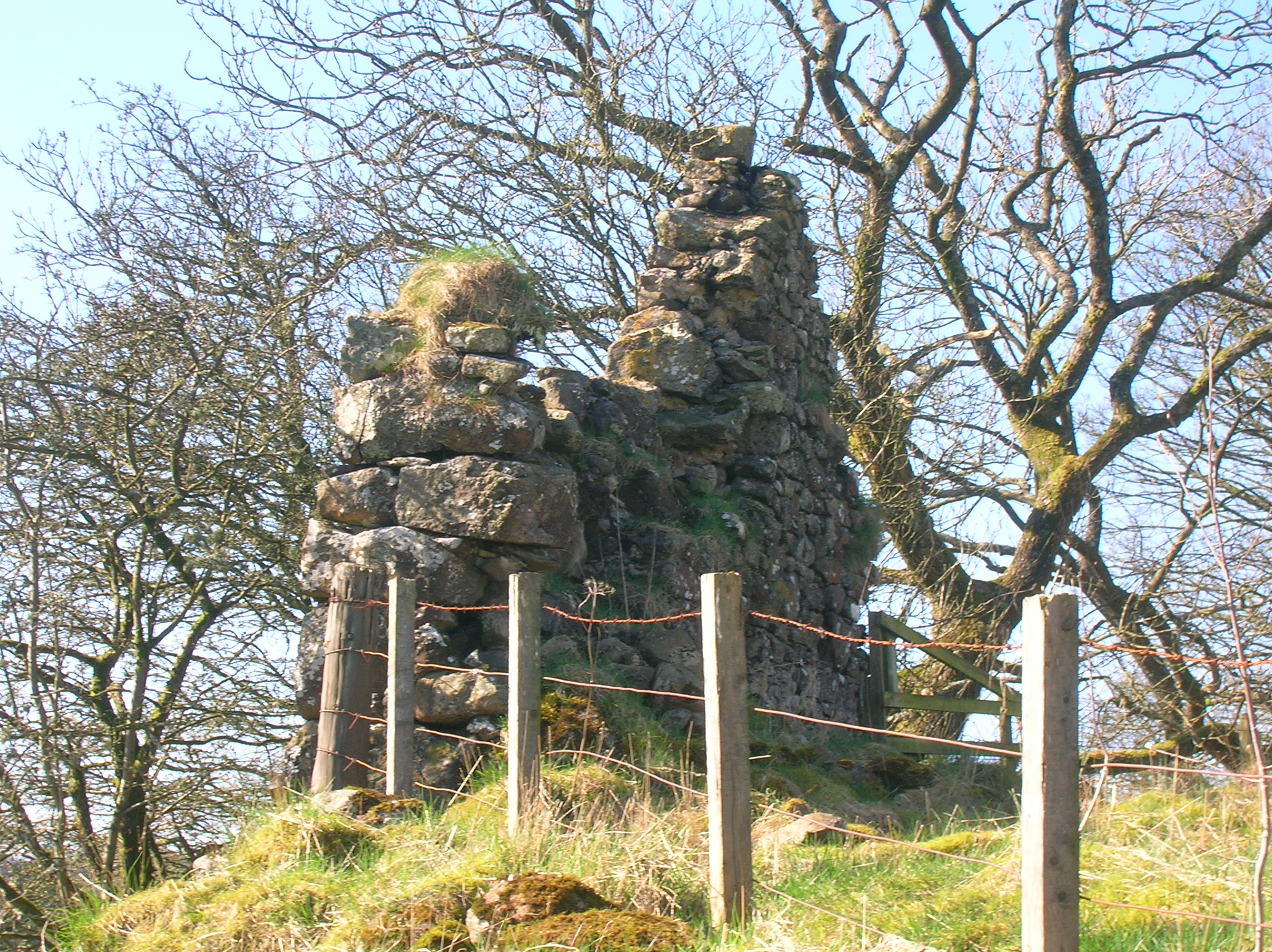
The oldest ruins at Mid Town of Threepwood

Mid Town Farm was obtained by William Anderson in the 1630s from Robert Love of Threepwood. In 1858 the settlement is marked with a single roofed building and a ruin that abuts onto the lane leading up to Threepwood House. In 1895 Mid Town is shown as a ruin.

=== Town Head of Threepwood ===
In 1858 Town Head is shown as a single building accessed from the west and in 1895 it is roofless, but a new private dwelling has been built at the site in recent times.

=== Townend of Threepwood ===
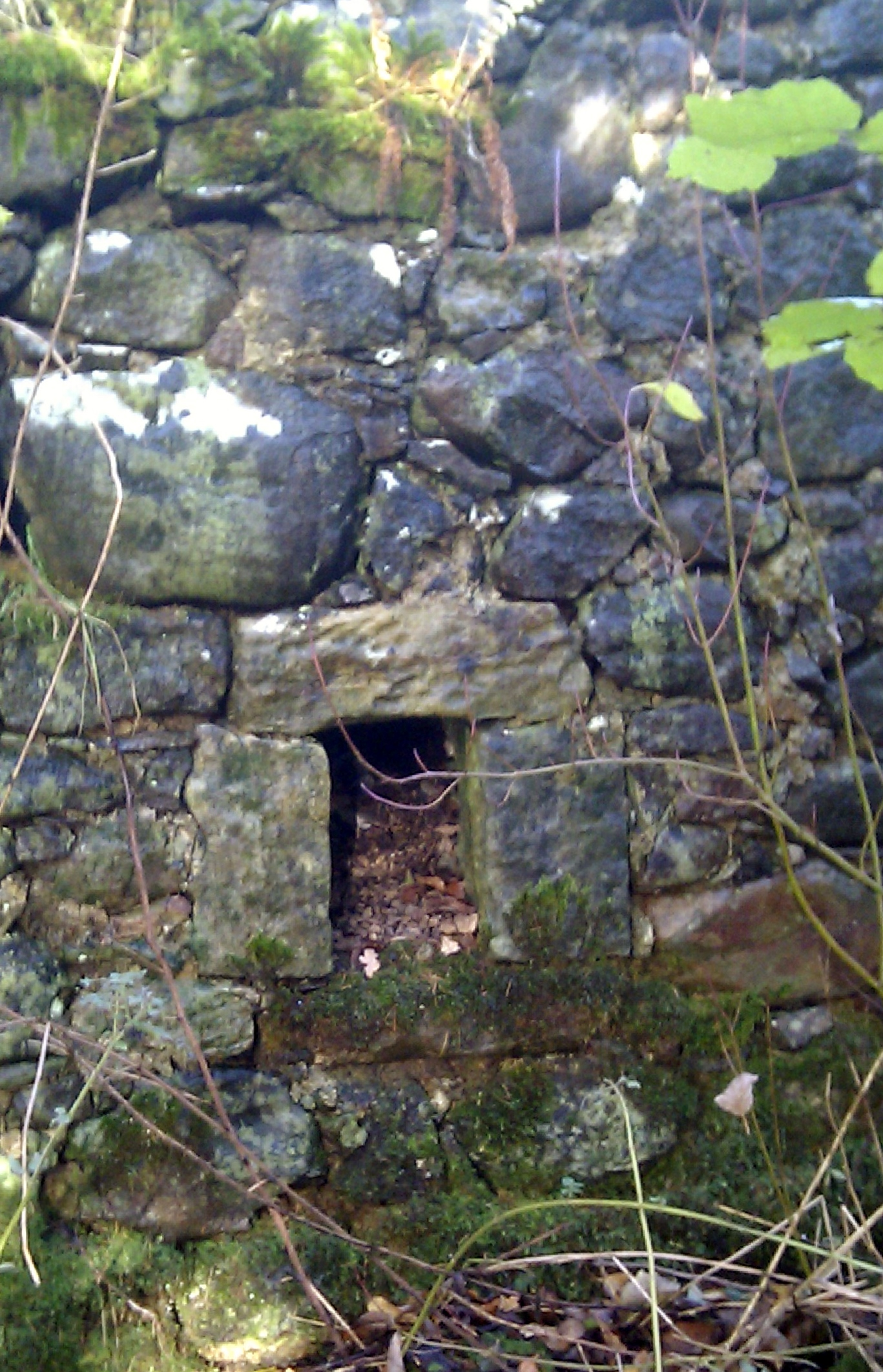
Wall feature at Townend of Threepwood a possible 'Jug' hatch

In the 1630s Townend Farm was obtained from Robert Love by Thomas Fulton. Hugh Stevenson was the farmer at Townend of Threepwood Farm in the early 19th century and after his death his sons succeeded him, later however the lands were divided and sold. The Barn-fauld field was purchased by John Love, Esq., of Threepwood. Circa 1847 the area was surveyed and divided off from the other portion of the property which was then purchased by Robert Shedden Patrick, Esq., of Trearne and Hazlehead. In 1646 a John Fulton is recorded as dwelling at the farm of Boydston near Mill of Beith.

John Shedden of Marshalland, called "The Lang Laird" because of his height, married Mary Stevenson of Townend of Threepwood. The couple had five daughters and one son, John, known as "Jack the Marshalland" or "The Gem-keeper".

Jack the Marshalland

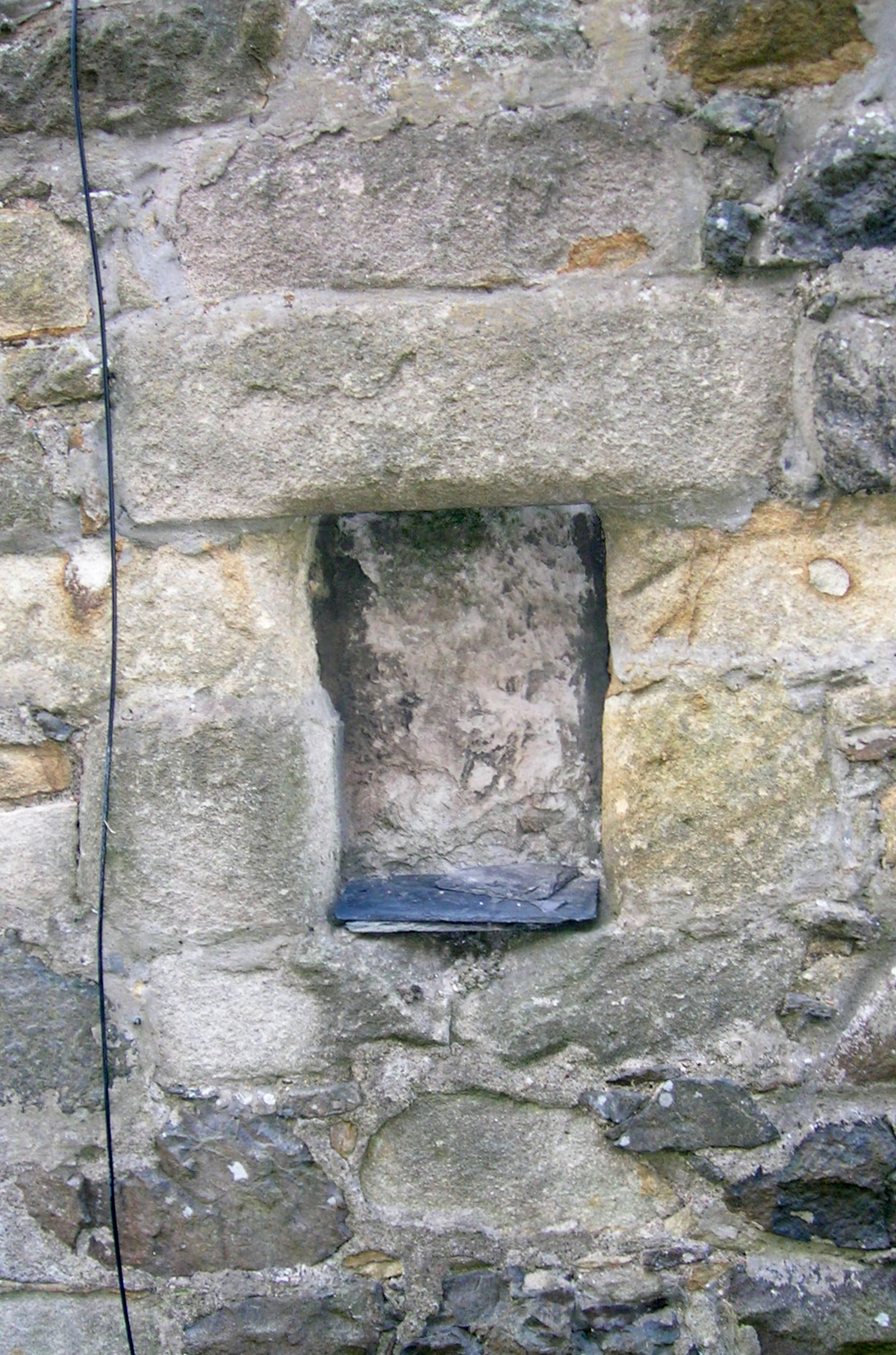
'Jug' hatch at the old Bucks Head Tavern in Stewarton.

Born on 25 April 1756, John Shedden of Marshalland married Mary Raeside in 1836, however they had no offspring. John was a tall man, strong and a notorious poacher of hares at a time when poaching was governed by archaic laws. After several court appearances Jack moved to a large estate in England where he worked as the head gamekeeper, earning a good wage and returning with substantial savings. On his return he became ironically known as "The Gem keeper" and when he died his poacher friend Thomas Stevenson fired off his gun to the "rict and left" over his grave, much to the surprise of George Colville, the minister at the time.

Uses

In 1858 a group of buildings are shown here with three unroofed and two in use. The road widened here on both sides and a small building with a nearby well lay on the northern side, the southern side having two out of three buildings that faced the road still roofed, although the shed or byre attached to the westernmost is shown as a ruin. A sizeable rectangular enclosure lies to the west on the other side of the access driveway to Sunnyside of Threepwood. In 1895 only the westernmost building appears to be in use and the others are not even marked. The single building is still shown as roofed in 1908 and 1912.

At first a farm, the site lost most of the buildings until only one remained in 1908. A busy area in terms of horse drawn transport along Threepwood Road and pedestrian traffic so that the building may have provided accommodation for travellers and/or bleach works employees. The unusual 'window' at the back resembles the 'Jug' windows found in pubs where a jug or bottle of beer was filled and taken away to be consumed elsewhere as recorded in this poem about 'The Den' at Barkip -

The Auld Hoose is stinnin yet, we kent it best by Pugs,
But there's no a buddy rinnin noo, wi bottles or wi jugs.
For noo its lost its license, an' there's no a drap ava,
Though miny a bottle has been selt, through the wee hole in the wa'.

The narrow 'layby' on the roadside with a well and small building suggests water and food for horses.

== Threepwood Bleach Works ==
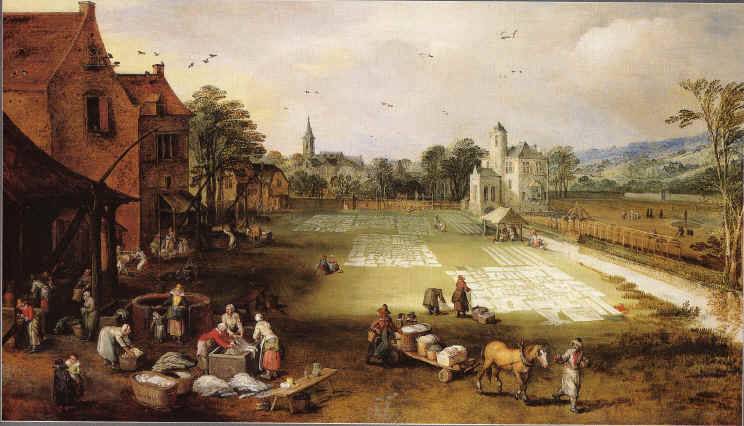
A bleachfield

Cotton cloth or linen was originally bleached by repeatedly steeping it in an alkaline solution or lye derived from ash tree or fern ashes, called 'bucking'. The treated cloth was then washed and exposed to sunshine and air by being hung out in bleachfields or 'crofts'. After being immersed in buttermilk, called ‘souring’ it was given a further wash, and then dried. The process was very time-consuming and could take up to eight months to 'buck', 'sour' and finally dry.

Two separate bleach works are marked on the Ordnance Survey maps and areas of open ground are indicated which would have been the bleachfields. Ample supplies of water were available from the Cadgerford Burn and the Dusk Water that run through the area. Supplies of lye made from ash tree ashes would have been plentiful in this well wooded district. In 1828 the 'Bleachfield' is recorded with two buildings in different areas that are probably the bleach works. The largest bleach works lay next to a millpond fed by the Cadgerford Burn that supplied water for both the 'bucking' process and power for the waterwheel. Dye works buildings lay close by with a path marked that also ran to the other bleach works site that lay next to the Dusk Water with a wooden bridge over the watercourse. By 1895 both bleach works and the dye house are shown as ruins on the OS maps which links with the discovery of chlorine on the late 18th century after which Bleach works and the associated bleachfields became redundant.

By 1855-57 the works are recorded in the Ordnance Survey name book as bleaching linen thread, worked by water and providing accommodation for workers. A Mr John Stevenson was the occupier whilst the Love family were the proprietors.

Lows Cottage near Coldhame was a retting works and was located next to one of the Lowes Lochs which was used as a retting pond for flax preparation. Davie's o'the Mill lay nearby and is thought to have been a flax or lint mill, leading to the suggestion that these industrial activities all located along Threepwood Road and nearby may have been inter-dependent business ventures. A flax or lint mill also once existed near Brownmuir on the Muir Burn. Flax made into linen was also used in the manufacture of thread by the Crawford Brothers, first in Beith and later in Barrmill.

=== Sunnyside of Threepwood ===
In between the two bleach works in 1858 is located a building with a very ornate walled garden, in all likelihood the dwelling of the works manager and has two dated stones of the marriage stone type, dated 1790 with 'I(J)R and JC' and 1759 respectively. The second stone is badly eroded and any initials are not discernable. This relatively small building also has an access off Threepwood Road via the settlement of Townend. In 1858 no name is given on the map to this dwelling. A plantation or screen of trees is shown lying to the west and a small ruin is shown on the lane to the lower bleach works where it ceases to be straight and runs in an easterly direction.

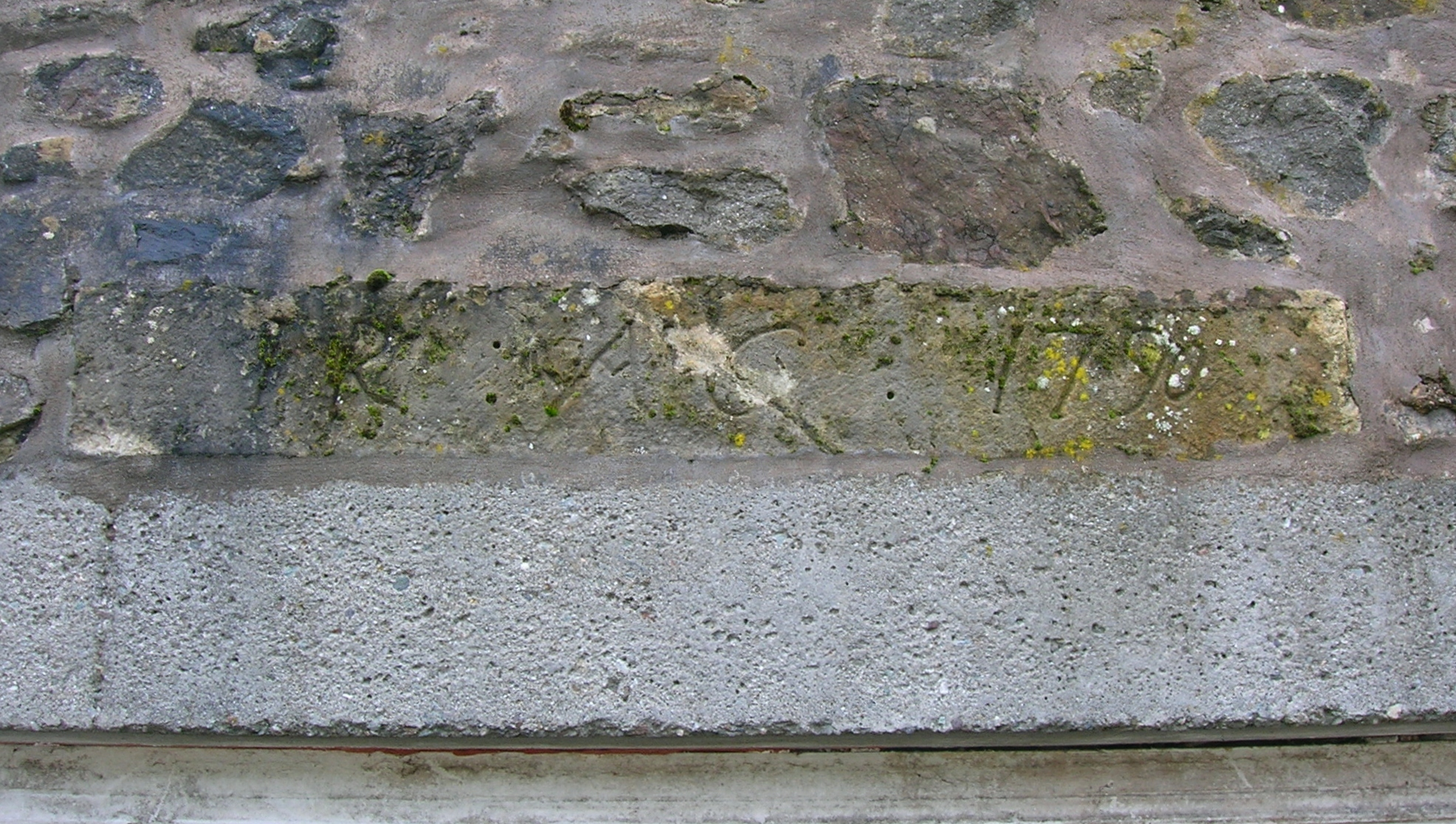
1790 Marriage Stone

In 1895 the name Sunnyside of Threepwood is used on the map and the dwelling has increased considerably in size with the oldest section lying to the east. The ornamental garden is no longer featured. It may be no coincidence that the name 'Sunnyside' is attached to the dwelling as Thomson's map shows that this was the open south facing site of the old bleachfield where the bleached cloth was dried.

== The Weaver's or Threepwood Well ==
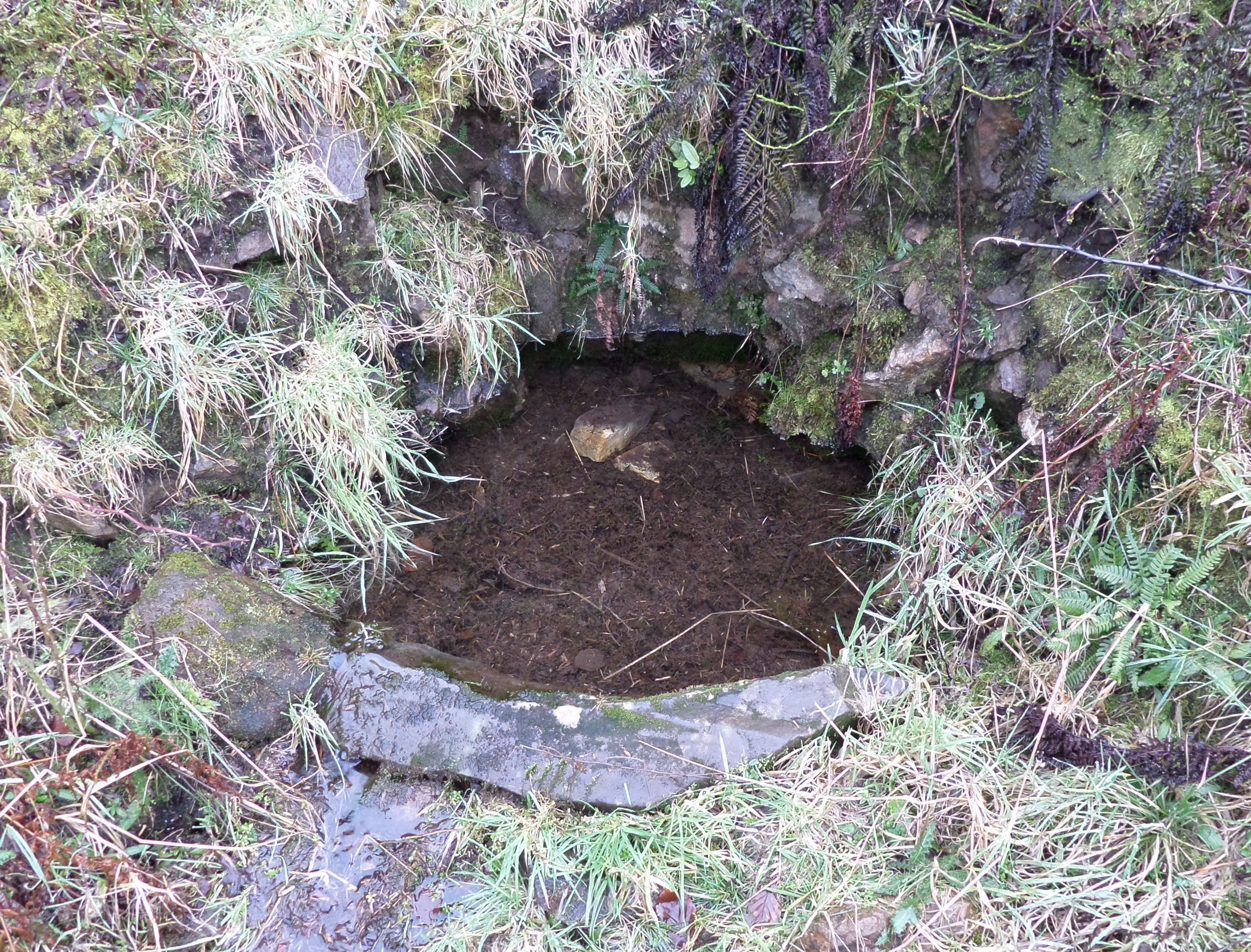
The Weaver's or Threepwood Well.

Close to Coldhame Cottage on the verge before the turning to Brownmuir Farm is a rare survival, the Weaver's or Threepwood Well, a freshwater spring that exits the rock in a steady flow that runs into a shallow excavation with a stone border, surrounded by heather, ferns, mosses, wild rose, whortleberry, willow moss, etc. The well was the site of the 'Weaver's Parliament' where the local weavers would meet to discuss business and other matters of importance. Lint or flax mills were located nearby and weavers would have been involved in producing the linen that was then bleached at the Sunnyside of Threepwood bleach works. The well sits on Threepwood Road which was on the route to Paisley where the weavers sold most of their finished products.

== Cuffhill reservoir ==
The 'Lower Reservoir' is first shown on the 1895 OS map and it is indicated that it is managed by the Beith Water Committee. In 1908 the reservoir with its dam and sluice are shown as managed by Ayr County Council.

=== The Cadgerford Burn ===
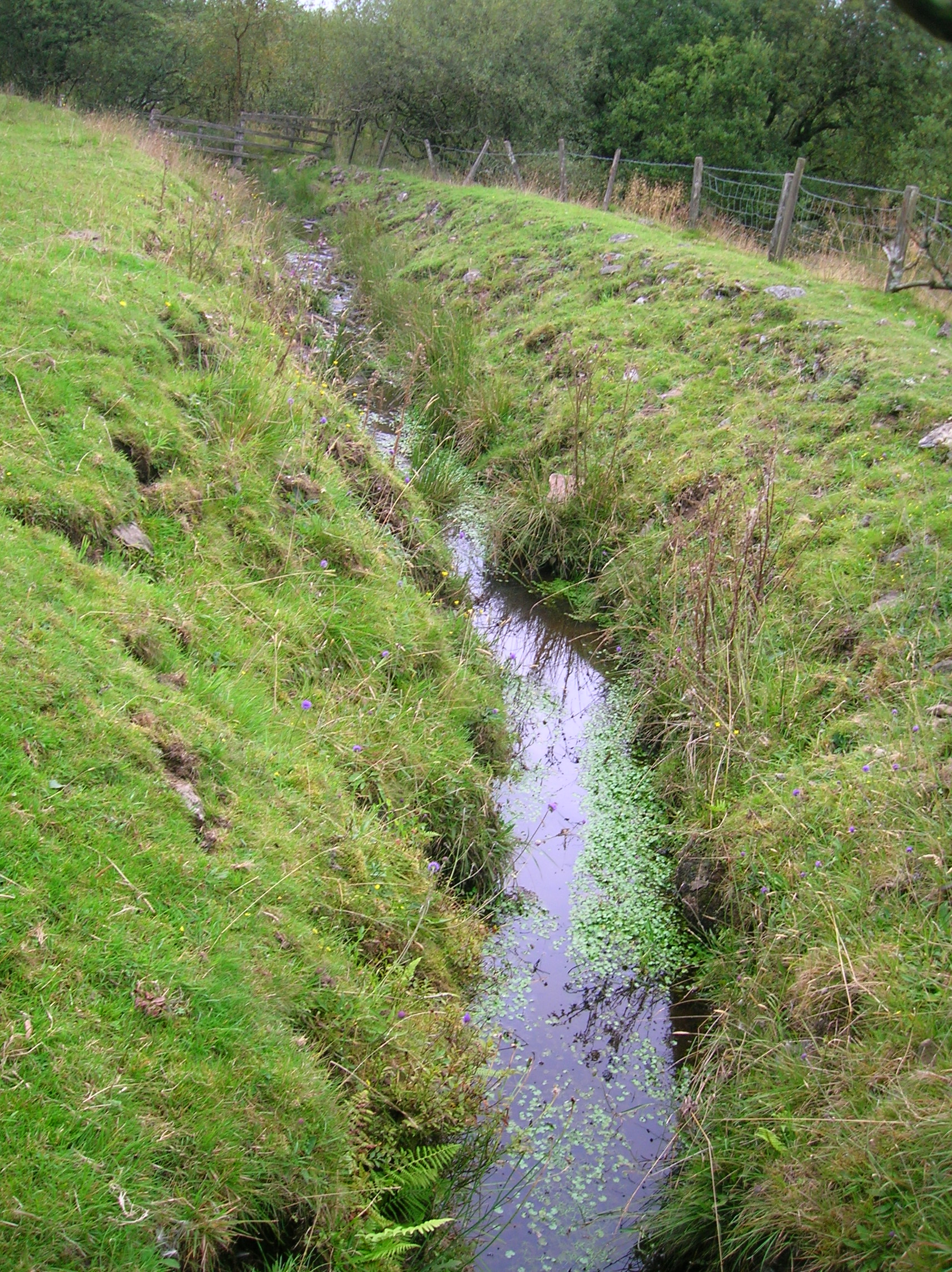
The Cadgerford Burn.

The name of the inflow and outflow burn indicates, as stated, a ford on this old road once used by cadgers or carriers on horseback of goods, including items such as Dunlop cheeses. The burn is the existing inflow and outflow from Lowes Loch to the Dusk Water. The burn now flows into the Kirkleegreen Reservoir, built after 1858 and by 1891. The waters of this old reservoir, now an angling loch, run into Cuffhill Reservoir and then into the Dusk Water. The ford may have been where a culvert now carries the outflow of the small loch in front of Lows Cottage down towards Lowes Loch.

Beith's annual fair, called Tennant's or Saint Tinnan's Day, was previously held on the Cuff Hill It was famous for its show, and its Cadger's parade and sale of horses.

== Archaeology ==
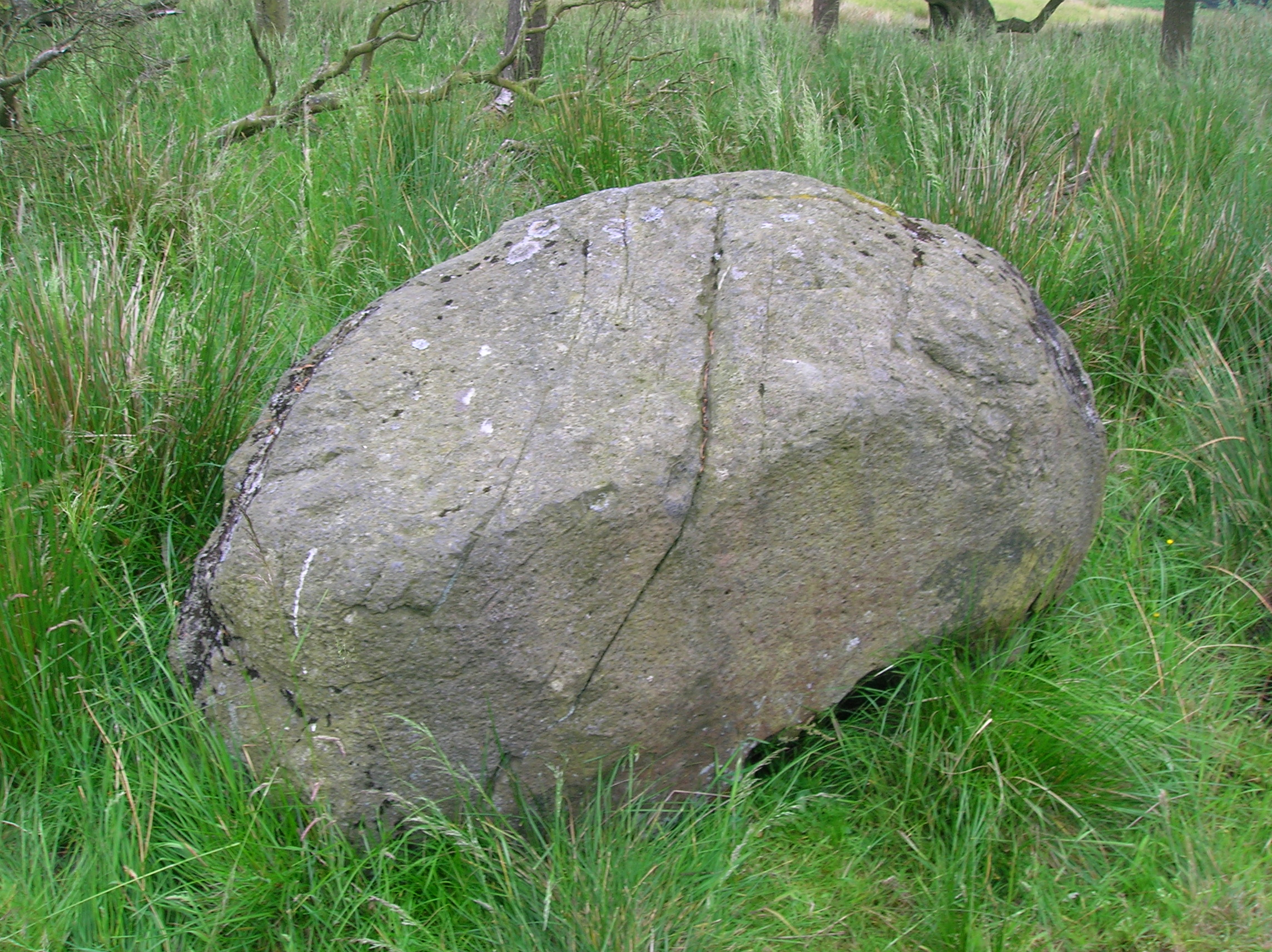
Detail of the Cuff Hill rocking stone.

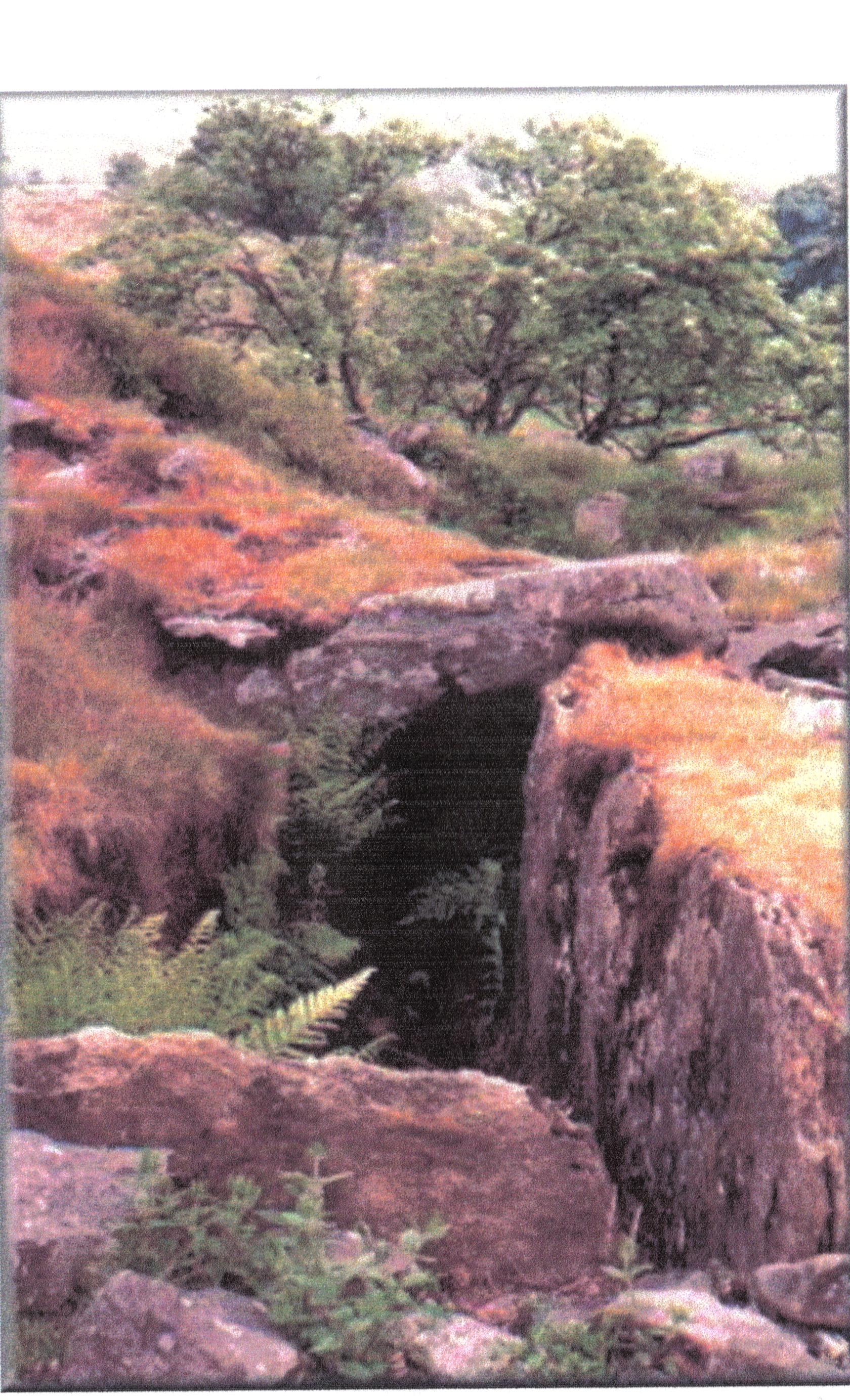
The Druid's Grave on Cuff Hill.

The Cuff Hill rocking stone (NS 3827 5542) is a large glacial erratic boulder of basaltic greenstone that some people associate with the Druids. It no longer rocks due to people digging beneath to ascertain its fulcrum. It is in a small wood and surrounded by a circular drystone wall.

On Cuff Hill were once located a group of four standing stones, also the Druid's Grave and the likely site of a pre-reformation chapel at Kirklee Green.

Hugh Stevenson of Townend of Threepwood was ploughing in Barn-fauld in the late 17th century when his plough hit an area of loose stones and a large pot was revealed containing bones and inside was a smaller object that has been described as small urn of the 'incense-cup' type.

Smith records that a Law Mound was located at Threepwood, twelve paces in diameter, however this place name is not marked on OS maps and is seemingly unknown by local inhabitants.

An arrowhead, bone comb and stone implement were found (NGR NS 388 554) near Sunnyside of Threepwood.

Finkillgreen on the lands of Threepwood is described as a grass covered rocky knoll on which a rocking-stone was situated. In the 1860s this stone could be easily rocked with one hand.

== The roads ==
Threepwood Road was a 'Statute Labour Road' maintained under Act of 1669 which required the appointment each year of overseers who would require tenants, cottars and servants to do unpaid work on the road. There were penalties for absence and the Heritors were obliged to supply funds for repair with tolls raised.

The 'Parish' road was built in 1810 and the Druids Graves cairn was robbed for stone to build it. On 30 December 1767 the Turnpike Committee looked at the road from Beith to Coldstreem (sic) Bridge. They felt it was not suitable for upgrading and that a new line would be both easier and shorter. The old road went over the hill between the Park Dykes of Overtoun and Cuff via Threepwood.

== Micro-history ==
A New Zealand flatworm (Arthurdendyus triangulatus) was found near Sunnyside of Threepwood in 2014. This introduced species eats earthworms and was once seen as potential threat to native earthworm populations. Bleachfield Grangehill was a cottage that stood by an old bleachfield. The lint mill near Brownsmuir was still operational in 1855-57.
