= Lands of Brownmuir =

- Beith, North Ayrshire, Scotland
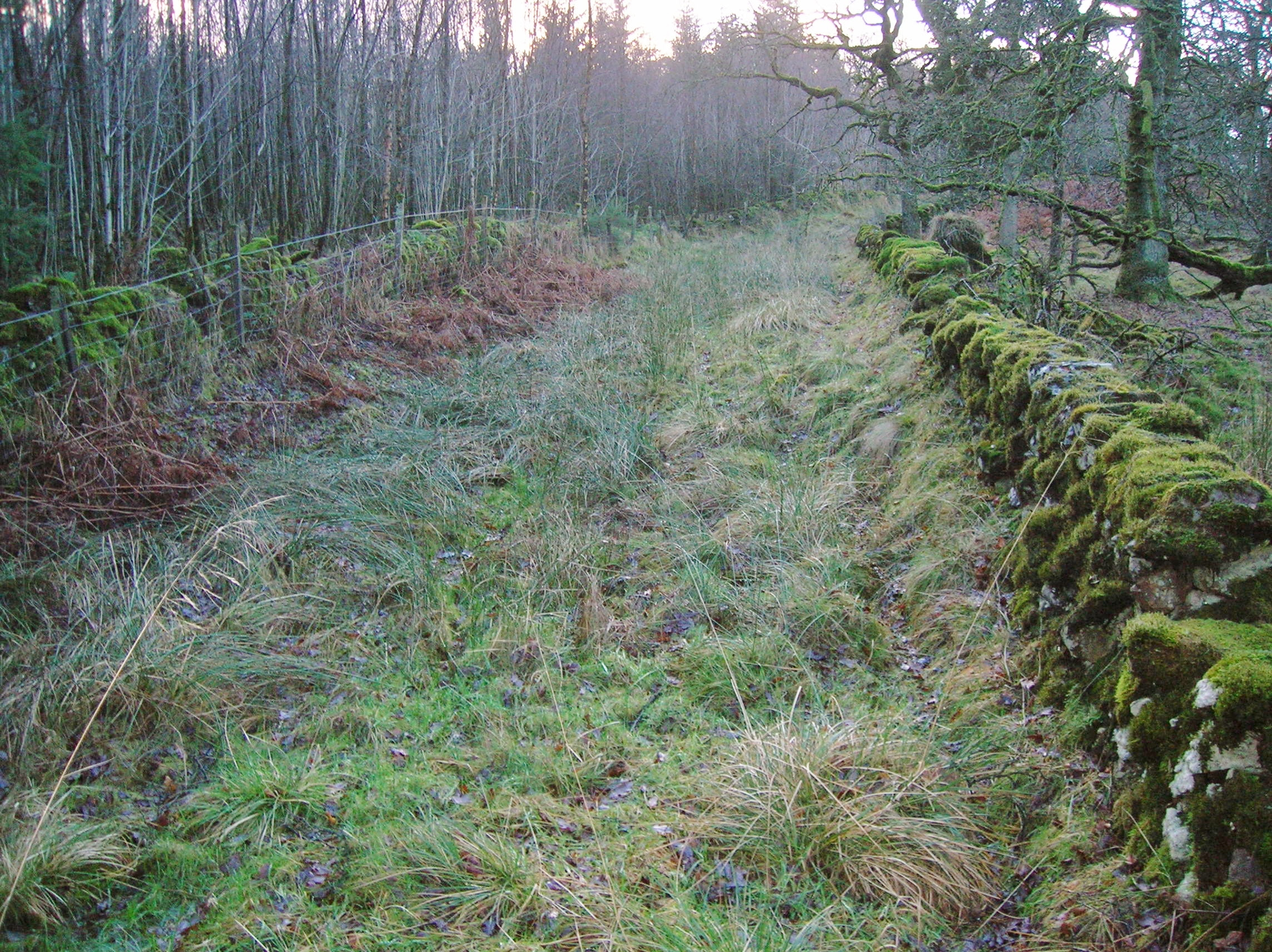
- Brownmuir Hill plantation and the Rakerfield drove road.

Site information
- Type: Laird's dwelling
- Owner: Private
- Controlled by: Hamilton
- Open to the public: No
- Condition: Now a farm

Location
- Shown within Scotland
- Coordinates: 55.769818°N 4.597952°W
- Grid reference: grid reference NS237656

Site history
- Built: 18th century
- Built by: Hamilton family
- Materials: Stone

The lands of Brownmuir, Brown Muir (1832) or Brimmer (1821) in Scots were located in the Parish of Beith, at the western boundary between East Renfrewshire and North Ayrshire, Scotland. The settlements of Brownmuir and Rakerfield were part of the old Brownmuir Estate. Brownmuir or Brimmer Hill at feet is a prominent eminence in the parish and it overlooks the area with Lochlands Hill and Cuff Hill relatively nearby. The old estate of Threepwood lay to the east.

== The History of the Lands of Brownmuir ==
The lands of Brownmuir lay in the Regality of Kilwinning and Bailiary of Cunninghame. The boundary to the west was with the Lands of Threepwood. A substantial laird's style dwelling is not indicated on the available 18th century maps of the area.

=== Brownmuir ===
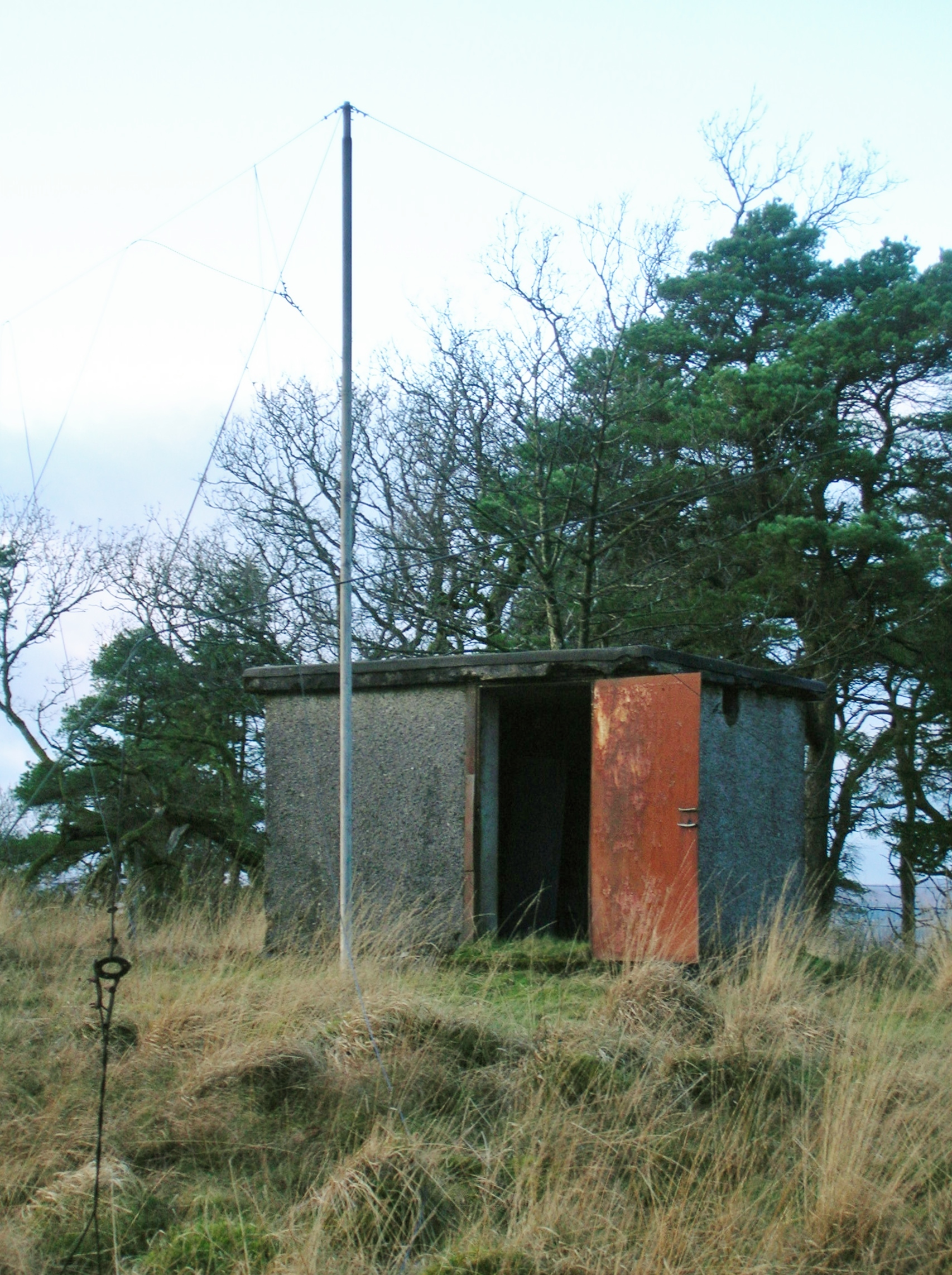
The radio shack and aerial on Brimmer Hill.

The name 'Brownmuir' or 'Brimmer' may derive from the appropriately descriptive terms 'brown' and 'moor'. The present day Brownmuir Farm is located on a lane that runs between Threepwood Road and the Boydstone and Knowes Roads.

A drove road once ran from near Brownmuir Farm passed Rakerfield Farm to join the existing road near Newmills. In 1856 a lint mill was located on the Muir Burn near Brownmuir Farm with a wooden footbridge and two dams on the watercourse. The mill was linked to the Boydston Road by a short lane. This mill was upstream of Mill of Beith and the 'Warlock Craigie Spout' or waterfall.

The ruins of the long abandoned Langbank Farm are situated on the northern side of Brownmuir Hill near the old drover's road's junction with the Newmills to Threepwood road.

Brownmuir Hill

Brownmuir or Brimmer Hill Plantation is mainly composed of oak, rowan, Scots Pine, birch and beech. The area is very wet with a high humidity and as a consequence the habitat is characterised by a large number of Sphagnum moss hummocks which rise up as much a metre above ground level. A whinstone quarry and a gravel pit were located on the Brownmuir Hill as were several well made cart tracks. On the summit are the remains of a radio shack and aerial in a remote fenced off area once supplied with mains electricity.

The road that ran around the southern slopes of the hill (see photograph) appears from its width to have been a 'drove road' used to drive cattle and sheep to market and considerable effort was clearlyctaken to construct good drystone dykes to confine stock to the road itself. It may also have been used by pack animals/mule trains and was built probably before wheeled vehicles were introduced on farms in the late 18th century; large sledges were in use by farmers at this time to move heavy loads.

=== Rakerfield ===
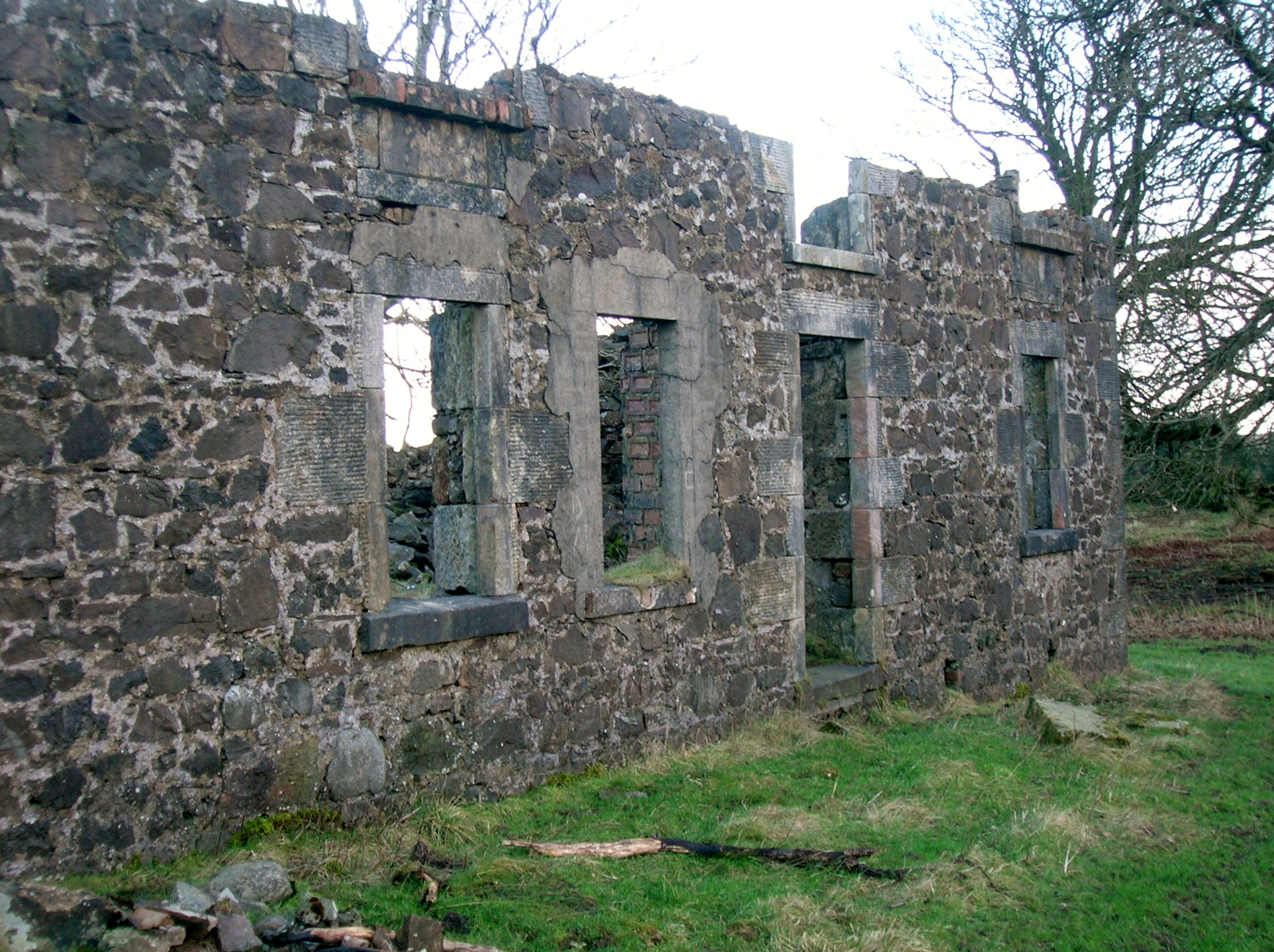
The ruins of Rakerfield.

In 1615 William Montgomerie, a merchant, lived at Rakerfield that was situated just off the above-mentioned old drove road that once formed a direct route from Beith to Howwood. Rakerfield Farm was a two storey dwelling of unusual construction, with well carved stone window and door surrounds, etc. It was once used as hunting lodge and a dwelling for a gamekeeper. Mrs & Mrs Blair, lived here at the time of the construction of Kirkleegreen Reservoir and it was purchased upon their death by Ayrshire County Council who the roof removed.

A 'Raker' is the Scot's for a traveller which may link with the old drove road that once ran past the property.

== The Lairds ==
=== Hamiltons ===
The Hamilton family of Brownmuir were probably descended from Udston, ancestor of the Hamilton's of Wishaw, however Dobie records that they were originally a cadet branch of the Hamiltons of Duchal and held Brownmuir for some centuries. The first recorded laird from circa 1611 is Hugh Hamilton and the next Hamilton heir is William, noted in the 1615 testament of William Montgomerie, merchant in Rakerfield. William appears in the inventory of Hew Montgomerie of Boghall, as having a claim for dry multures and he was in 1685 recorded on the roll of the Lochwinnoch heritors, as the feuar of the land of Auchinbothie-Blair. William Hamilton, the elder of Brownmuir, is recorded as a creditor in 1648 of Robert Gawane (Gavin) of Beith. In 1646 William's heir was also a William and his daughter was Ursula who married John Fulton of Boydston. In the 1630s the nearby Townend of Threepwood Farm was obtained by a Thomas Fulton.

In 1648 and 1701 William Hamiltoun of Brownmuir was an elder of Beith Kirk and a feuar circa 1658 of a farm of the lands of Auchinbothie Blair. William had two offspring, namely Jean and Ursula. Jean (b. 1662) married the antiquary and writer Robert Hamilton of Wishaw and her descendants succeeded to the title of Lord Belhaven. James Cochrane of Auchincreuch and Mainshill married Ursula circa 1691.

=== Crawfurds ===
In 1796 William, seventh Lord Belhaven sold the lands and mills of Brownmuir to Hugh Crawfurd who was a baillie and a writer in Greenock. Hugh Crawfurd married twice and had by his first wife had Hugh Crawfurd of Hillend and the second James, by Ann Dunlop, inherited the lands and sold them in 1829.

=== Pratts and later owners ===
John Pratt of Glentarkie in Fife purchased the lands from Lord Belhaven and became sole owner. John had married Isabella Crawfurd, third daughter of Hugh Crawfurd and upon their death the property passed jointly to Maria Eliza Stevenson and Margaret Stevenson. A Stevenson family once also lived at Townend of Threepwood.

Lands of Brownmuir

== Water Mills ==
A number of water mills were associated with the Lands of Brownmuir, including the Mill of Beith and probably the lint mill used for processing flax that was located on the Muir Burn near Brownmuir Farm above Knowes Mill, with an associated retting pond. The name of this lint mill is unrecorded. A mill also existed at Boydston on the opposite side from Mill of Beith and Davies o'the Mill may have been another flax mill. Bleach works were located at Threepwood and Sunnyside of Threepwood for bleaching linen made from the processed and woven flax.

The evidential records for these are that in 1677, an agreement is recorded between William Hamilton of Brownmuir, who was a heritable proprietor of the corn mill at Mill of Beith, and the suckeners of that mill.

The text of the agreement is as follows, laying out the amount of meal that the miller could take as payment for his work - "And the said coags to be the just proportionable pairt of the peck whereof the shilling is first measured at the said milne, and that in lieu and place and for satisfaction of all knaveschip, bunnock. gratification, or any other consuetude formerlie dew or is accustomed to be paid or required at the said mylne, and the saids two cogfulls of meill are to be kepped at the mylne eye and hand waved by the owner of the meill; and in case the millar of the said mylne dissent through dissatisficatione with the waving thereof, in that case the said milner is to have libertie to sift the samen, and instead thereof shall have two coagfulls of sifted clean meall straiked; and whilke two cogfulls of meal extending both to the thrid part of ane peck."

It is also recorded that when in 1796 William Hamilton, seventh Lord Belhaven, sold the Lands of Brownmuir to Hugh Crawfurd of Greenock, mills 'plural' are mentioned as being included in the sale.

== See also ==
- Beith
