= Auchenbathie Tower =

Castle in Renfrewshire, Scotland

- Auchenbathie, East Renfrewshire, Scotland; UK grid reference NS397565
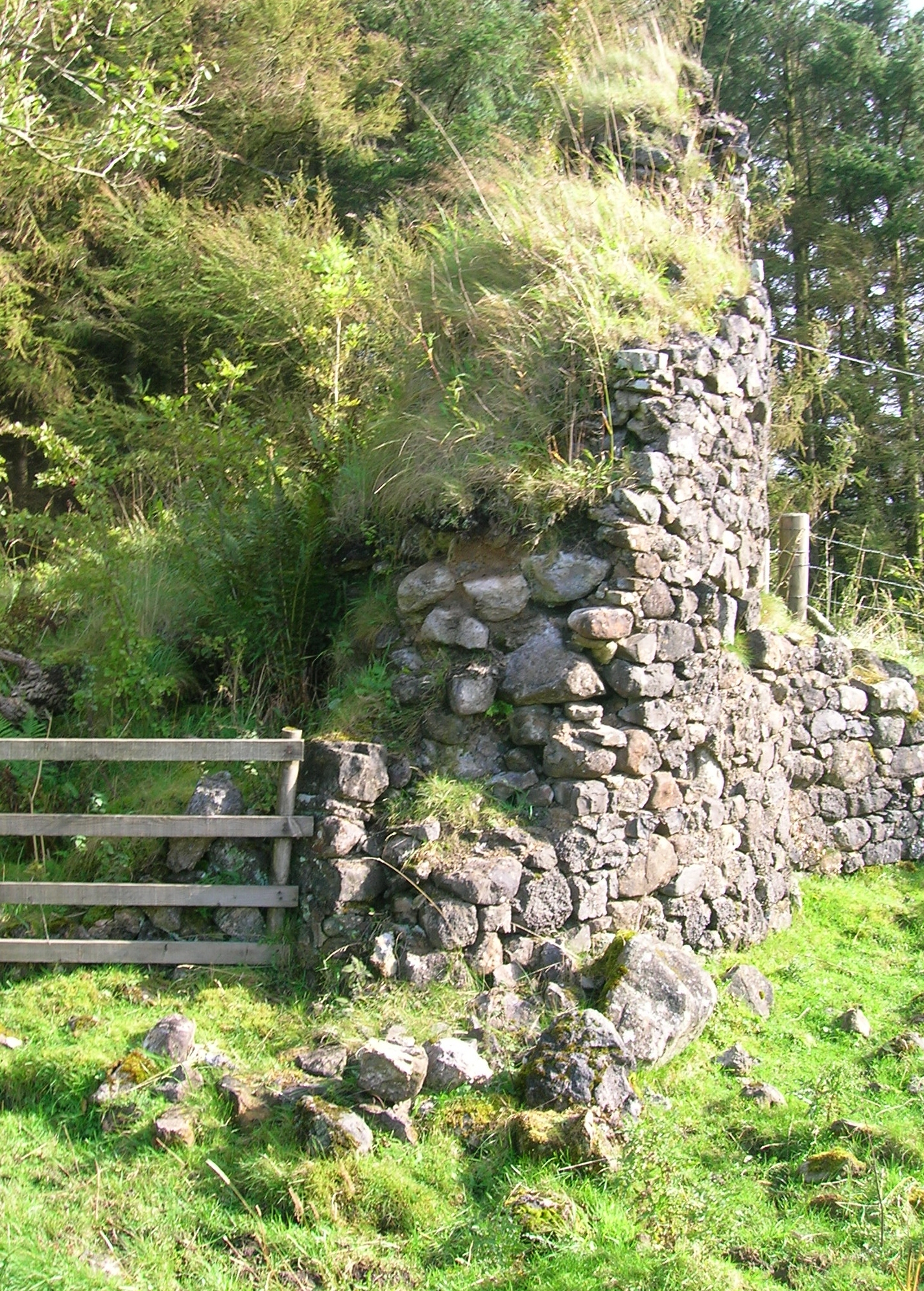
- The Tower of Auchenbathie Tower wall

Site information
- Type: Tower House
- Controlled by: Clan Wallace
- Open to the public: No
- Condition: Part of tower wall remains

Location
- Location within Renfrewshire
- Coordinates: 55.7752°N 4.5572°W
- Grid reference: grid reference NS438141

Site history
- Materials: Stone

Auchenbathie, Auchinbathie Tower or rarely Barcraigs Tower is a ruined fortification, a tower house, once held by the Wallace Clan of Elderslie, situated in Renfrewshire, Parish of Lochwinnoch, Scotland. The spelling used varies greatly and "Auchenbathie" will be used here as the standard spelling. The pronunciation locally is "Auchenbothy", the same as a Victorian mansion in Kilmacolm; no connection is known.

== Auchenbathie Castle ==
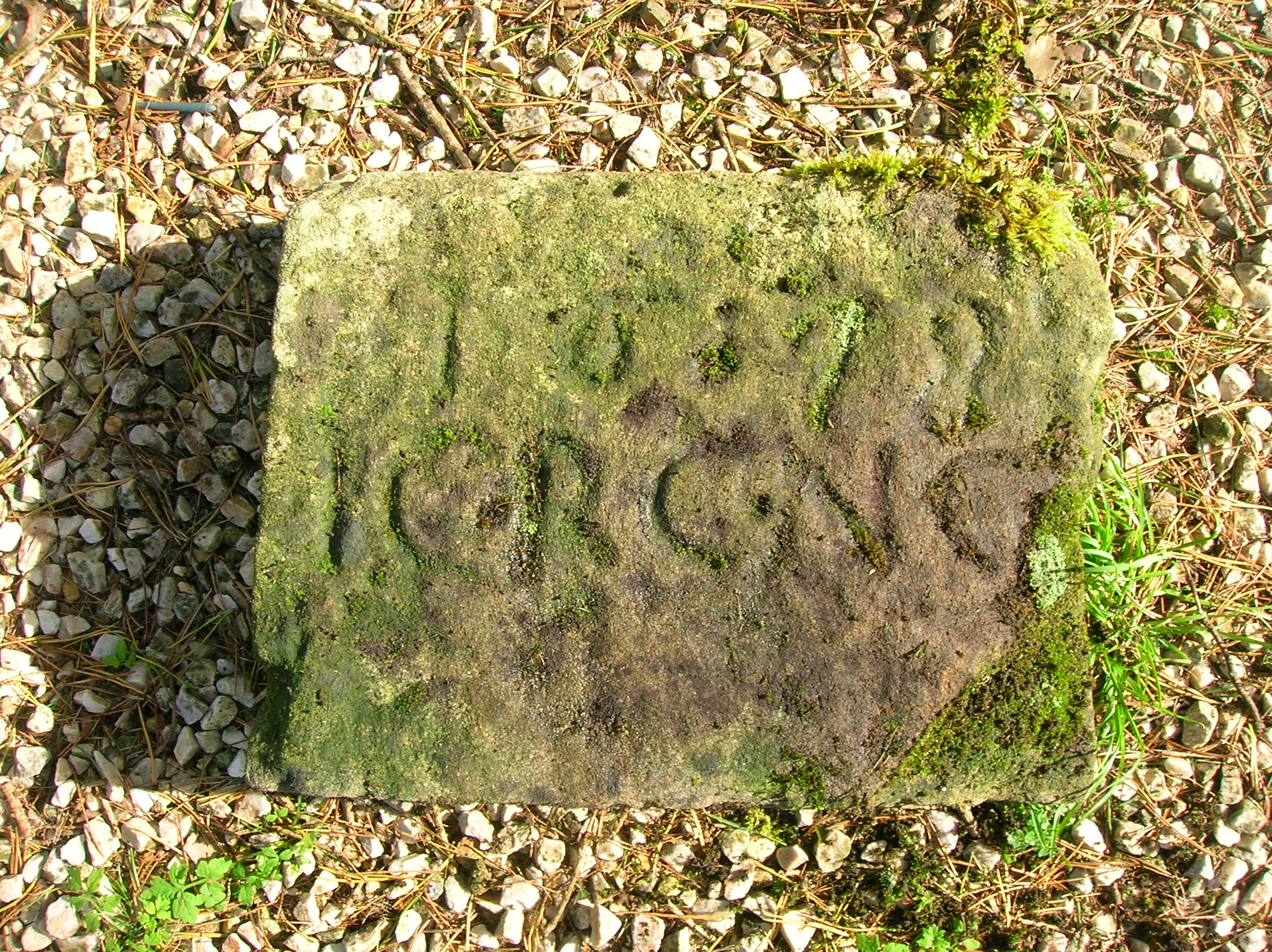
Carved stone from the old Tower Cottage

A carved stone was retrieved from the chimney of the old cottage, now a ruin, and this carries the date 1678 with the letters "I C R C N C". This stone was once located in the interior of the middle cottage and may refer to the Cochrane family. In 1828 the 'Paisley Magazine' recorded that considerable ruins of the old castle remained.

The ruins of the Tower of Auchenbathie or Auchenbathie Tower (NS 3980 5646) in the 1856 measured 29 ft by 10 ft to 12 ft, however only part of the side walls remain, standing to a maximum height of about 17 ft. A small byre stood within the old walls, once used as an outhouse for cattle. The tower was owned by the Wallaces of Elderslie in 1398. The walls are continuous though not in many places more than 4 ft to 5 ft high; a small portion of the wall has been removed from the side next to the ruins of the farmhouse.

== Cartographic evidence ==
Timothy Pont's manuscript map of circa 1583–96 shows an apparently intact tower, on a par with Caldwell Tower, the name Achinberthy, with a dwelling nearby. Boighous (sic) is also shown as a dwelling to the north. The Blaeu map of circa 1654, shows a Inborthy (sic), but not as a fortification. Boighous (sic) is again marked nearby. Roy's map of 1747 records the site as 'Tower' with an Achinbathy steading located to the east. In 1821 the Tower hamlet is clearly shown as a group of three buildings with Auchenbathy nearby and Auchenbathy Top as a dwelling further up the lane. Thomson's map of 1832 shows a single building at Tower to the west of the road and Auchenbathy nearby with Auchenbathy Top, now Tophouse. The name changes from Auchinbathie to Auchenbathie on the later OS maps. The 1897 1 inch map clearly indicates 'Tower' in gothic script, located at the site of the present elevated stone wall remnant to the west of the road.

Some confusion has developed over the location of the old tower, due to the placing of the gothic script annotation on the OS maps. The position of the script has been taken as indicating that the building on the side road, where a wood is now located (2011), was Auchenbathie Tower. This ruined vernacular building has the appearance and location typical of a smithy with a cottage, possibly adapted from buildings associated with the tower.

== Wallaces of Auchenbathie ==
Very little is recorded other than the tradition that the Wallace family held the Tower of Auchenbathie, lying about 5 miles from Ellerslie (sic). Sir Malcolm Wallace, who some believe to be father of Sir William Wallace, may have been Lord of Elderslie and Auchenbothie, although William's own seal gives his father's name as Alan Wallace.

The Wallaces parted with a portion of the barony of Auchenbathie to Blair of that Ilk and this included the ruins of the old tower. The other barony was Auchenbothie Wallace; the family line died out around 1650.

Metcalfe records that in 1398 John Wallace of Elderslie passed the lands of Auchinbothie Wallace to his son, Thomas Wallace. The Wallaces of Ferguslie and the Wallaces of Neilstonside were descendants of this John Wallace of Elderslie. The Semples of Eliotstoun and the MacDowalls also held the lands of Auchenbothie at various times.

In 1596 sasine of Auchinbothie through 1597-98 was held by David Cunningham of Robertland.

In 1603 John Montgomery of Achinbotthy (sic) held the lands of Waterlands at Lugton. His wife was Margaret and he had four children, John, Margaret, Anna and Christian. The son John may have died before his father as the three daughters each inherited a one third share in the years 1616. 1617 and 1620.

=== Wallace's Knowe ===
Wallace's Knowe (NS 3933 5687) was a small hill, situated in the barony of Auchenbathie Wallace, close to Boghouse Farm (now a ruin) and Auchenbathie Tower in the midst of a moorland, which was a meadow in summer, but a loch in winter.

"Malcolm Walys her gat in mariage,
That Ellerslie had in heritage,
Auchinboth and othir sindrie places,
The seocon oe he was of gude Walys.

In English -

"Malcom Wallace her got in marriage,
That Ellerslie then had in heritage,
Auchenbothie, and sundry other place;
The second eye he was of good Wallace."

Tradition states that Sir William Wallace defended himself with his attendants here against a party of Englishmen. Paterson records that "there is much evidence of this tradition." There are many large boulders, and a few trees on this knowe. Most of the hill is now submerged in Barcraigs/Rowbank Reservoir, except for the highest point, which forms a small island. Metcalfe also records, in 1909, that "Near the ruin of the old castle on the lands of Auchinbothie, on the farm of Laightrees, is a small eminence in the midst of a meadow called Wallace's Knowe, where, according to tradition, Wallace defended himself a party of Englishmen."

== Lands of Auchenbathie Blair ==
The Poll Tax Roll records Robert Cochrane as residing in the 'Tour of Auchenbathie'. He was a heritor and worked as a weaver and merchant living with his wife Agnes and children Ro; Jo; William and Margaret. Other residents within the tower site were a weaver William Wilson and his wife; John Kerr, weaver and Jen Dunsmuire his wife; John Young apprentice; John Wilson, weaver and Agnes Muir his wife.

=== Clachan history ===
Roy's map of 1747 shows that this clachan or hamlet was situated at the junction of two early roads running from the Lugton area to Howwood and onwards to Paisley. The 'castle' is named simply as 'Tower' and Achinbathy is given as a habitation nearby. Tower is later recorded as a farm; one map has an indication of a gate across the lane. The nearby cottage is recorded as Auchenbathie Cottage until the farm was abandoned, at which point it is recorded as Tower Cottage. The prefix Auchan, Auchen, Achen, or Achin refers to a field recently created from woodland or rough land, deriving from Scottish Gaelic Achadh an ... meaning "Field of the ...". This is one of the few sites in Renfrewshire where the remnants of an infield can be seen behind the tower ruins.

The Tower Well is in a field opposite the old vernacular building, probably a smithy, situated on the side road. A tradition survives that the more recent Tower Cottage/Achinbathie Cottage was built as a toll house. An ancient farm, now a total ruin, was located at Broomknowe nearby.

=== Fultons of Auchenbathie ===
The Fultons of Auchenbathie were a cadet branch of the old Grangehill family. Fulton of that Ilk is said to have moved here following the loss of their lands in the parish of Kilbarchan.

John Fulton was a staunch Jacobite and acquired considerable wealth through smuggling. Contraband were transported inland on horseback, owing to the bad state of the roads. In 1748 John Fulton of Auchenbathie was killed by David Malloch, an excise officer, whilst smuggling spirits near Pollockshaw. His remains rest in the churchyard of Lochwinnoch with the bones of his ancestors. The jury found the officer guilty, however he was given a pardon. It is also said that the laird lost his inheritance through his support for the Jacobites and became a cadger or gatherer of eggs in the parish and died in great poverty.

The nearby farm of Birdiehouse is said to be named for the smuggled Bordeaux wine that was hidden here before passing on to Paisley and beyond.

John Love (born 1781) of Threepwood, acquired the lands of the Tower of Auchenbathie and some of the lands of New Mill of Auchengown Stewart; he married Jean Fulton of Sproulston.

Views of Auchenbathie Castle and clachan

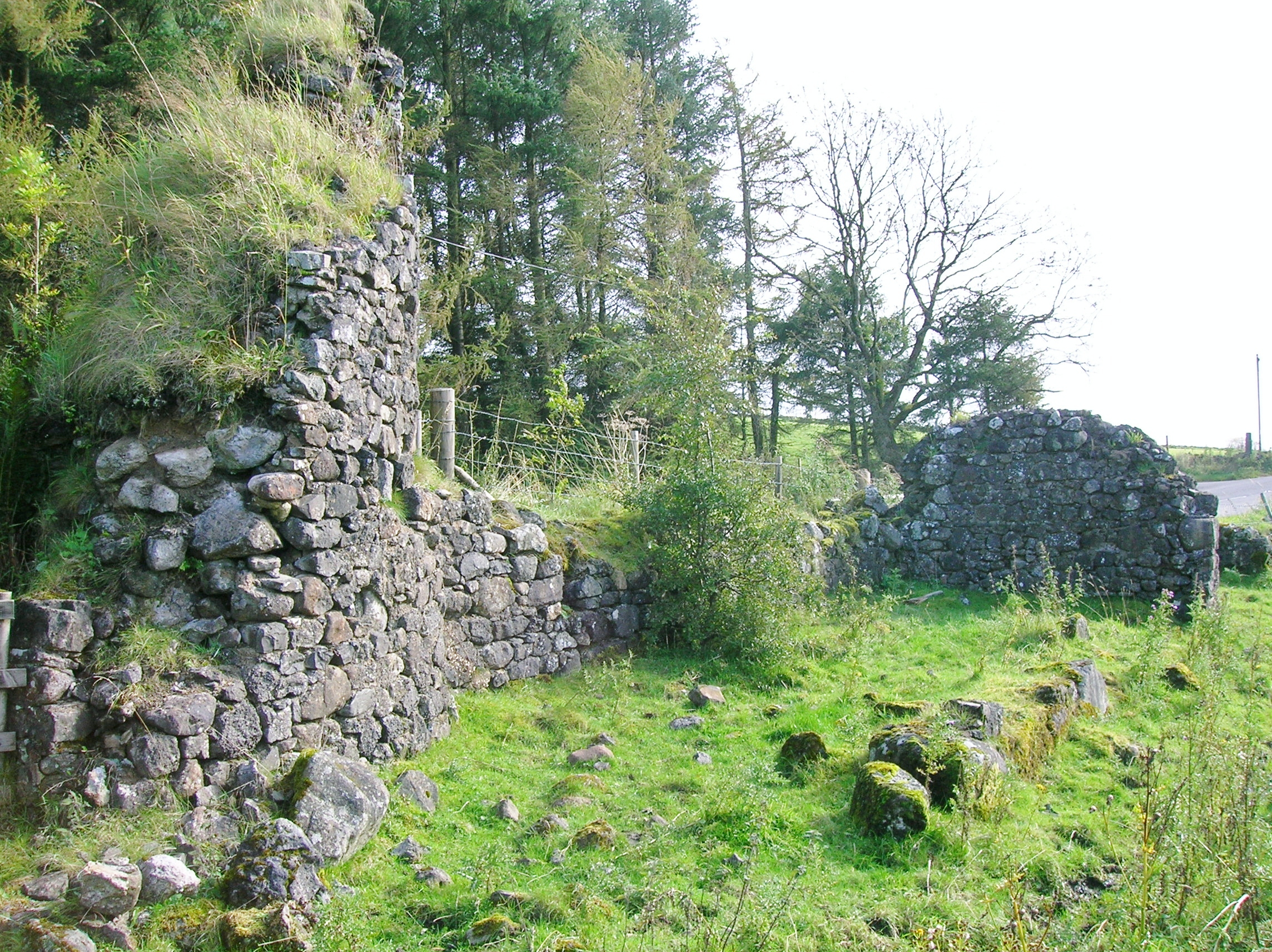
The tower and farm byre ruins

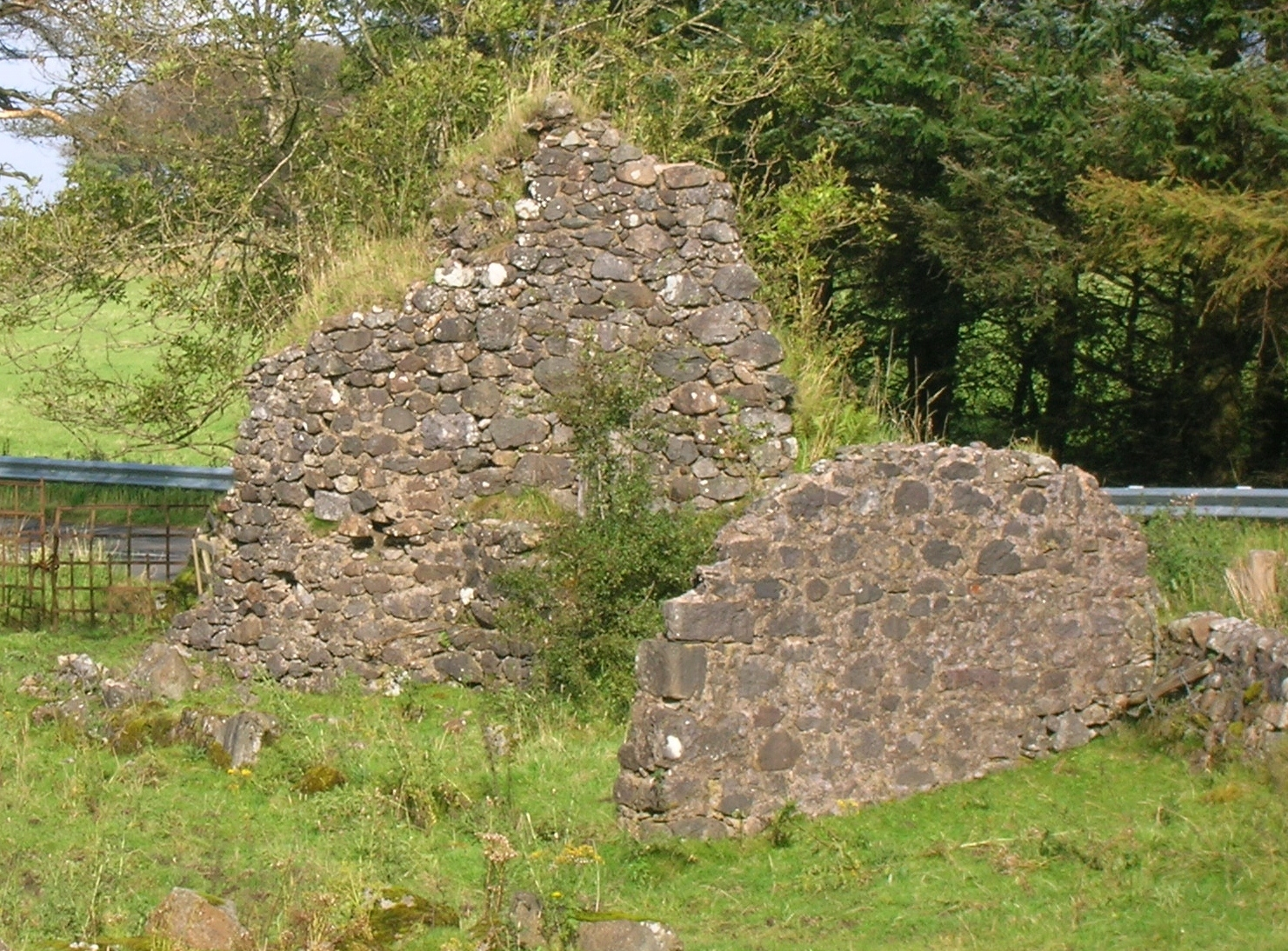
The Tower wall

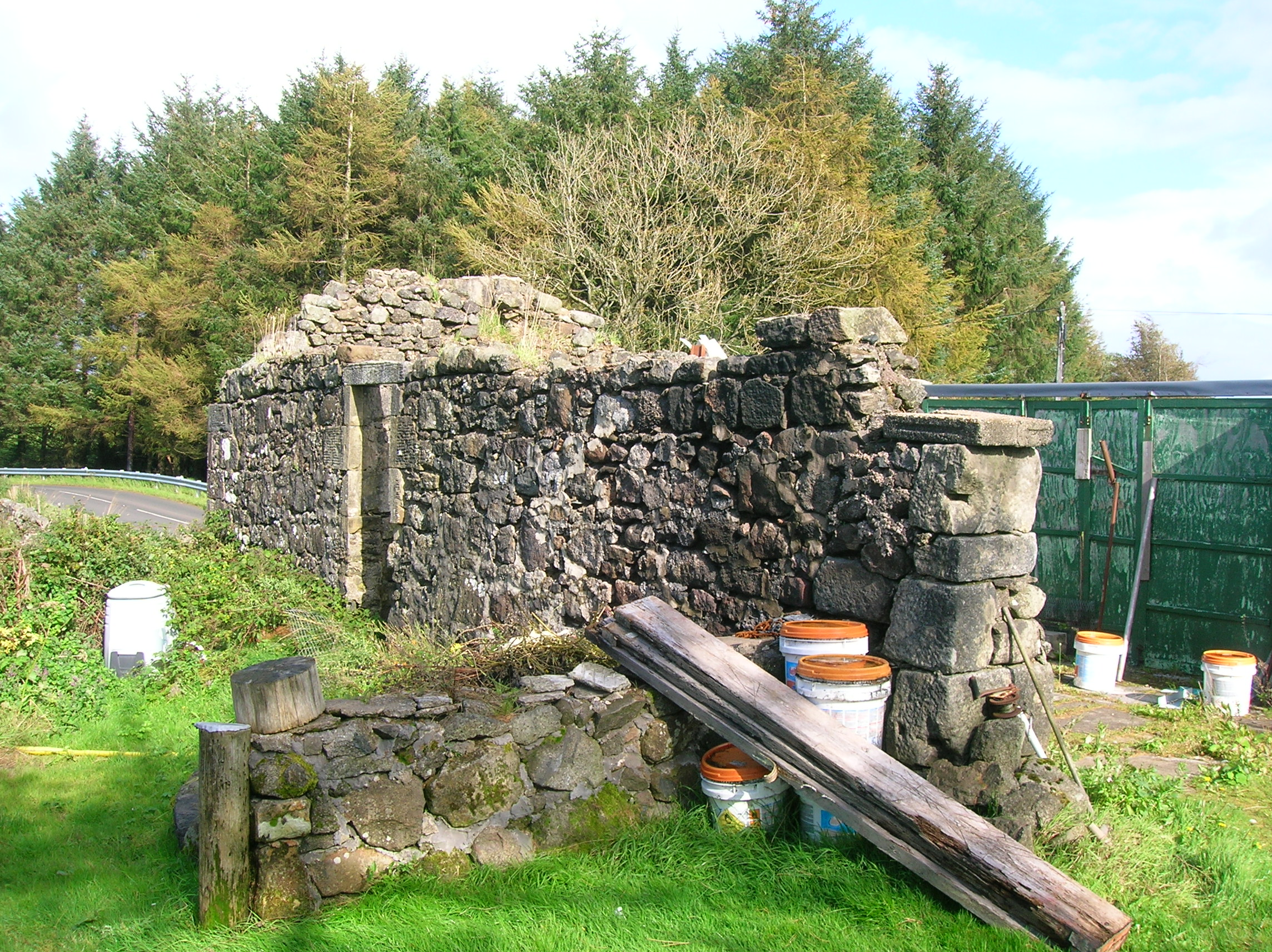
Auchenbathie/Tower Cottage

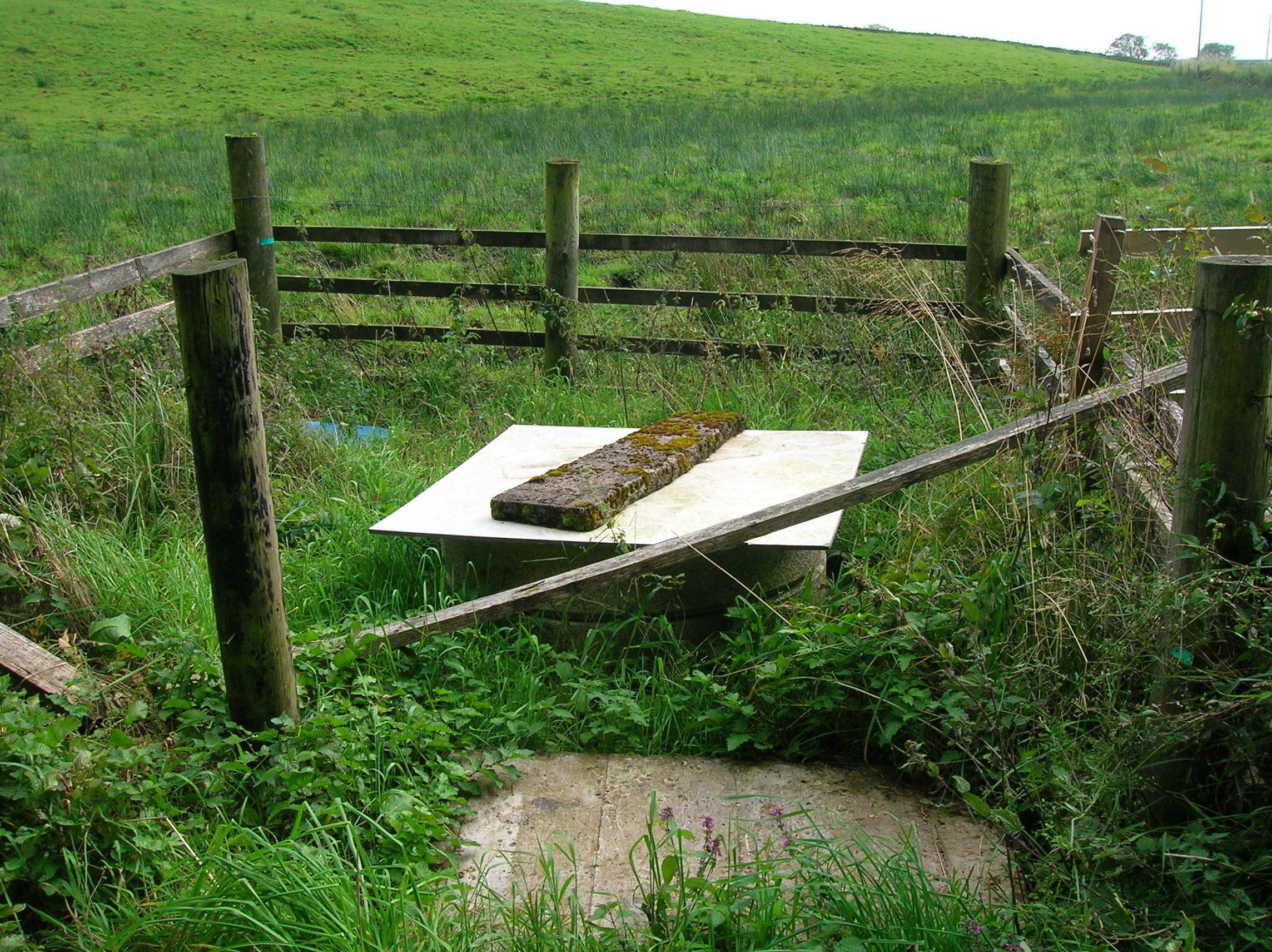
The Tower Well

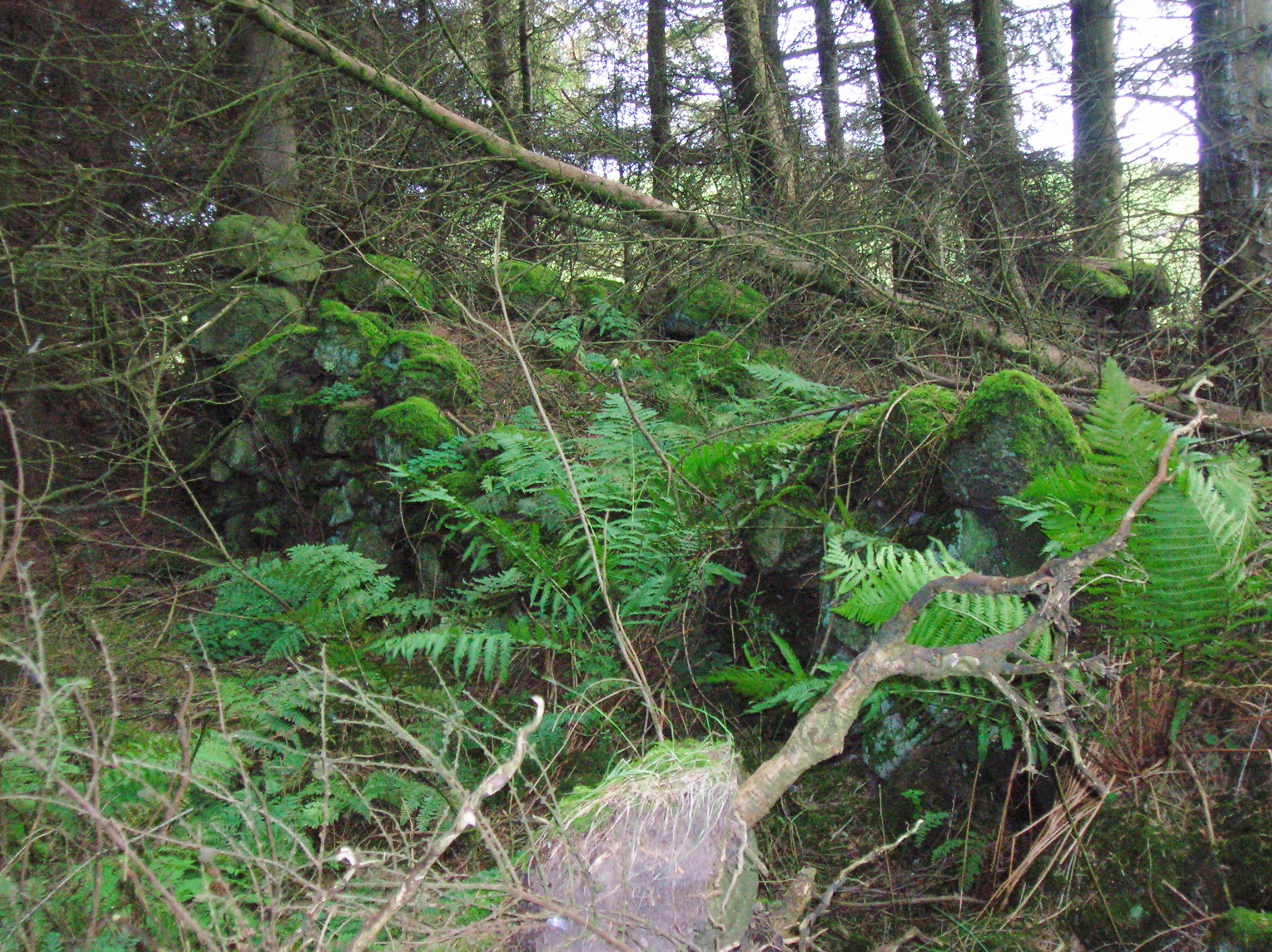
Ruins of the possible smithy

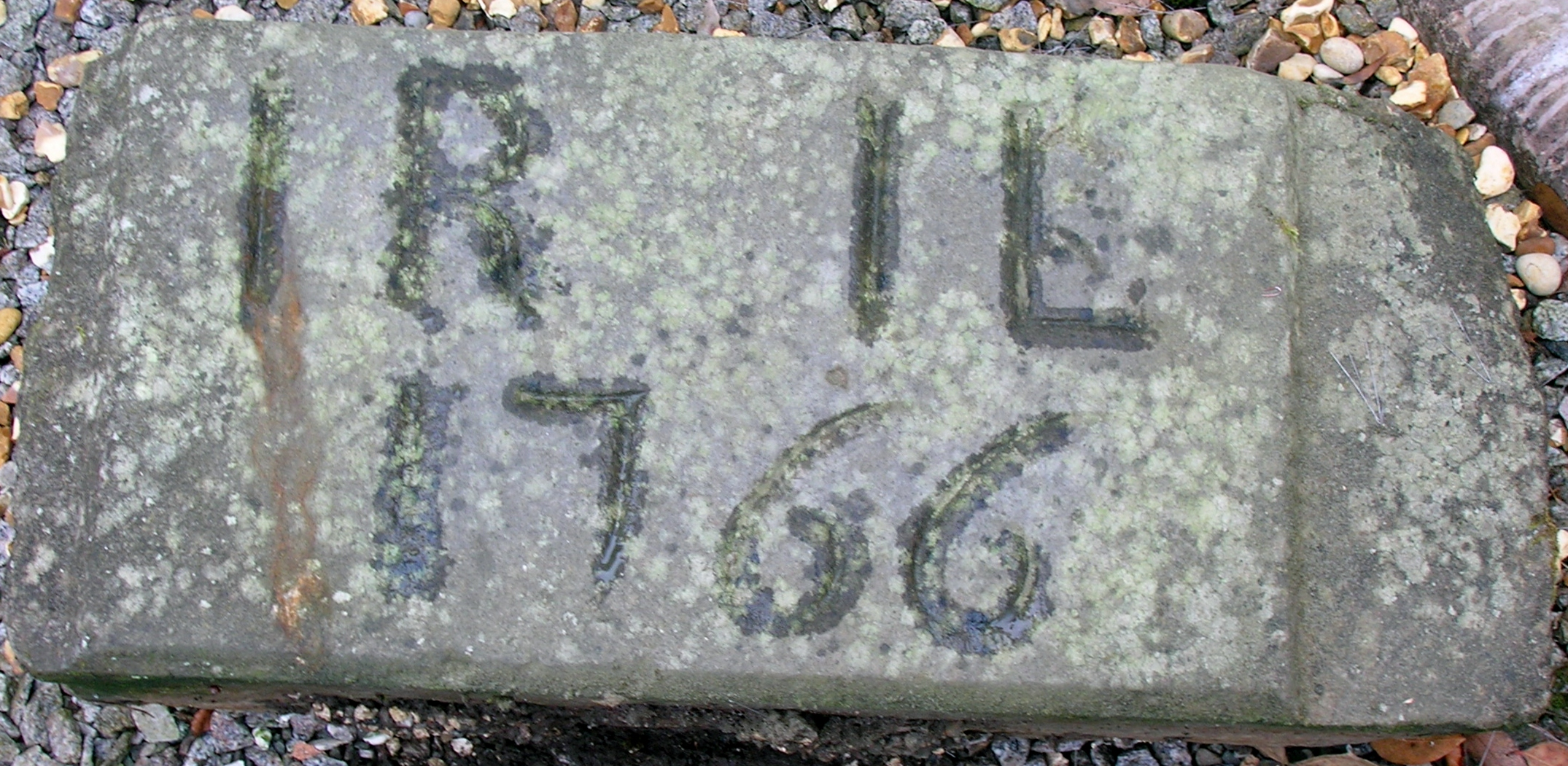
Marriage stone from Longpark

=== Wilson of Auchenbathie ===
Saunders Wilson was a Paisley weaver and also made illicit whisky. To pursue his whisky distilling he decided to move to Auchenbathie Tower that was not only a safer place but also Beith at that time was a centre of smuggling. In 1785 he had a son Alan whose birth to his wife Katherine Brown is recorded in the parish register. Saunders had another son, Sannie (Alexander) who worked a cow herd for Mr Stevenson of Threepwood and later a silk wever in Lochwinnoch. Alexander Wilson became a minor published poet in 1790.

== Barony of Auchenbathie ==
Frances Groome's Ordnance Gazetteer of Scotland (1882–40) describes Auchinbathie:

"Auchenbathie, a barony in the SE of Lochwinnoch parish, Renfrewshire, contiguous to Ayrshire, 3½ miles ESE of Lochwinnoch town. It belonged to the Wallaces of Elderslie; it is mentioned by Blind Harry as one of the places which Malcolm Wallace, the father of Sir William Wallace, "had in heritage"; and it has remains of a small ancient castle, called Auchenbathie Tower. Another Auchenbathie is in the neighbourhood, and, as having belonged to another family than the Wallaces, is called Anchenbathie Blair." In 1572 Cuthberto Sympill de Auchinbothie was a signatory to a charter as was his servitor William Wallace.

The Barony was later split into Achinbathie Blair and Achinbathie Wallace. Paterson records that the farm of Nethertrees was the farm of the barony and Wallace's Knowe stood within its lands, surrounded by a small loch in winter. The Stewarts of Blackhall purchased the barony of Auchenbathie Wallace and retained the superiority into the 19th century.

Barony Mill

The Blaeu map of about 1654 clearly shows the barony mill as Neu Mil (sic). Thomson's map of 1832 shows the New Mill with a substantial mill pond and the annotation "Mill Dam". The barony mill was known as the Newmiln of Auchengown and the family of King were in possession until around 1726. Rob Roy MacGregor is said to have used the mill as a hide out when times were difficult.

== Auchenbathie Burn ==
The Auchenbathie Burn winds 4 miles along the Beith boundary to the head of Castle Semple Loch. The Muirhead Burn that drains Walls Loch runs close to the tower and associated farm town.

== Auchenbothie House ==
Auchenbothie House is located in Kilmacolm, the architect, William Leiper, designing the house and estate in 1898. Whilst Leiper also designed the gate lodge, this element was later overseen by Charles Rennie Mackintosh in 1901 and 1907.

== See also ==
- Elderslie
