= Clyde Muirshiel Regional Park =

Regional park in Scotland

Coordinates: 55°47′50.8″N 4°37′10.2″W

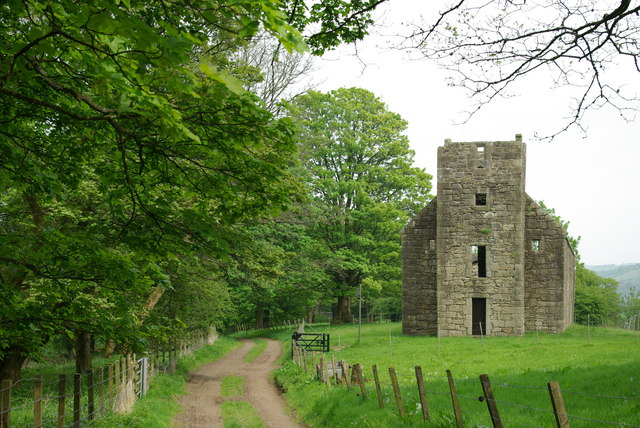
- Castle Semple Collegiate Church

- Location within Scotland

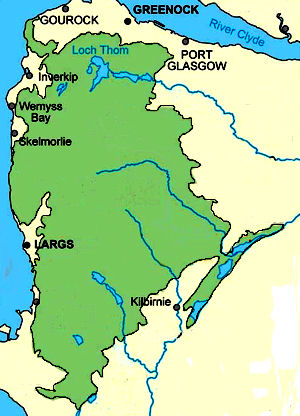
- Location in Scotland
- Location: Inverclyde, North Ayrshire and Renfrewshire
- Area: 280 km^{2} (110 sq mi)
- Governing body: Clyde Muirshiel Park Authority
- Website: clydemuirshiel.co.uk

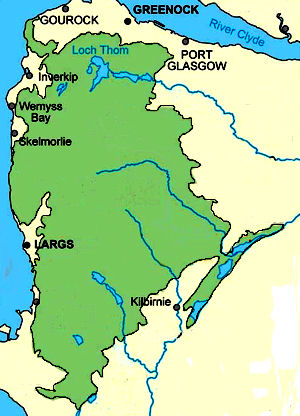
Extent of the park area

Clyde Muirshiel Regional Park is the collective name for areas of countryside set aside for conservation and recreation on the South Clyde estuary in Scotland. The park covers an area of 280 km^{2} (110 sq mi) of Inverclyde, North Ayrshire and Renfrewshire, stretching from Greenock in the north, down the coast to Largs and West Kilbride and inland to Dalry and Lochwinnoch. There are three visitor centres within the Park Castle Semple Loch, Muirshiel Country Park and the Greenock Cut (formerly Cornalees Bridge).

Muirshiel, a Scots language name, translates to "moorhut" in English.

== Origins ==
Originally a grouse shooting estate, based around Muirshiel House - a shooting lodge among Duchal Moor and Queenside Moor. The estate passed through a number of owners including Lord Howard of Glossop, the Marquess Conyngham. Lord Howard of Glossop sold part of the estate to the county council and to a mining company in the late 1930s and early 1940s. The remainder was sold to Renfrewshire County Council in 1952.

A Regional Park designation for the area was first proposed in 1947. However it was 20 years later that Renfrewshire County Council proposed the Renfrewshire Regional Park and implemented a programme to manage an area of 30,000 acres (12,000 ha) including the creation of Muirshiel Country Park in June 1970. Castle Semple Water Park followed in 1971 and the Cornalees Bridge Visitor Centre opened in 1973. Responsibility for the parks was taken over by Strathclyde Regional Council in 1975 before the Clyde Muirshiel Park Authority came into existence in 1990. The Park Authority oversaw the running of the Park until it was disbanded in 2021. Each local council is now responsible for their section of the Regional Park within their catchment. The Park stretches across Inverclyde, Renfrewshire and North Ayrshire councils.

== Facilities within the park ==
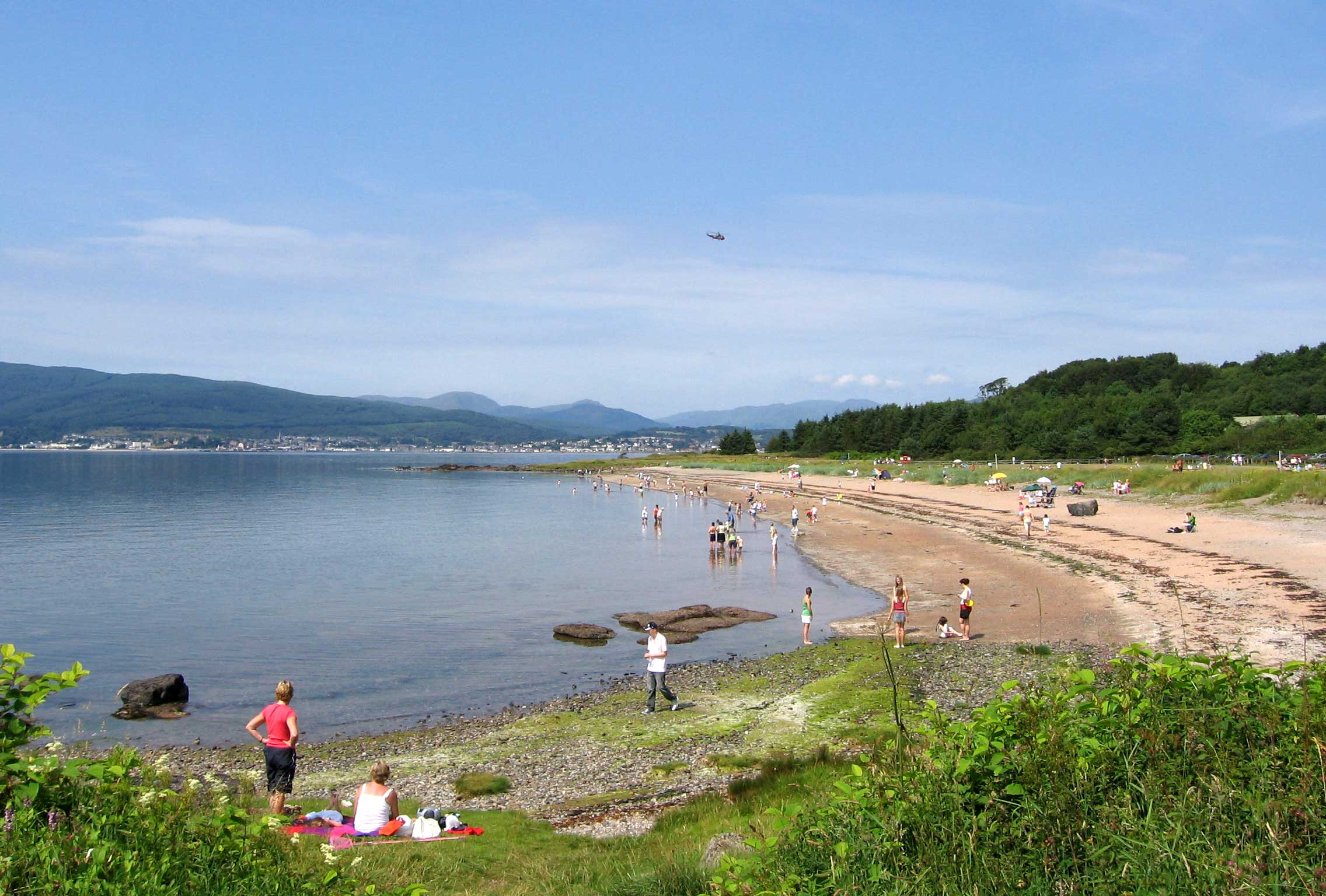
Lunderston Bay Beach and picnic area.

Two country parks with visitor centres are located within the regional park at Castle Semple Loch and Muirshiel, together with a separate visitors centre, the Greenock Cut Centre, at Cornalees Bridge, Loch Thom, to explain the Greenock Cut. An outdoor activity centre and boat and bike hire facilities are based at Castle Semple.

The current logo of the park (top) and the Viking longship logo used in the 1970s and 80s. This was also used by Cunninghame District Council on signage for Largs, on the western fringes of the park.

Community woodlands are to be found at Locherwoods and Outerwards. The sandy beach at Lunderston Bay is connected by a shore walk along the coast to Inverkip. Loch Thom and the Greenock cut provide easy walks in a context of industrial history, and the Collegiate church and Castle Semple are of interest to historians of an earlier era. There are numerous other sites, such as the Haylie Brae, with car parking for visitors to enjoy picnics, good views, wildlife, walks and cycles, and wide opportunities for hillwalking, with Hill of Stake the highest point of the park at 522 metres (1,713 ft).

== Activities ==
Clyde Muirshiel offers year-round instructor led activities include sailing, kayaking, canoeing and raft building on the shallow inland Castle Semple Loch as well as land activities such as archery, mountain biking, hill walking, orienteering, navigation and first aid.

Popular walking routes in the park include the 4 km (2.5 mi) Johnshill Loop and the 12.5 km (7.8 mi) Semple Trail from the visitor centre of Castle Semple, the Greenock Cut route at 11.5 km (7.1 mi) or the shorter 2.5 km (1.6 mi) Shielhill Glen Nature Trail, both from the Greenock Cut visitor centre.

Hill walking routes from the visitor centre at Muirshiel include a 2 km (1.2 mi) trail up to Windy Hill, and a more challenging 10 km (6.2 mi) circular route past the Barytes Mine to Hill of Stake, the highest hill in the Regional Park. Routes from the Greenock Cut visitor centre include a strenuous 5 km (3.1 mi) walk up Dunrod Hill, and a 10 km (6.2 mi) walk over Corlick Hill.

=== The Sustrans Cycle track ===
The Sustrans Lochwinnoch Loop Line cycle track runs through the Castle Semple Loch visitors centre. It is 14 miles (23 km) long and is part of the Lochs and Glens Route. It follows the National Cycle Route 75 from Paisley Canal Railway Station to Johnstone and then heads southwest to Kilbarchan, Lochwinnoch and Kilbirnie passing Castle Semple, Barr and Kilbirnie Lochs. Being mainly built on an old railway line it has easy gradients and is mostly traffic free.

National Cycle Route 753 branches south off Route 75 in Gourock to Lunderston Bay, where it passes the toilets and picnic areas within the park, before it continues along the coast of the bay to terminate at Inverkip War Memorial. Short sections of the route are on public roads (Albert Road, Gourock & Harbourside, Inverkip). A separate stretch of Route 753 runs from Seamill to Ardrossan, near the southern extremity of the park.

== Sports Clubs at the Loch ==
The Loch is the home of the following clubs; Castle Semple Sailing Club (founded 1966), Castle Semple Rowing Club and Clyde Windsurfing Club.

== Historic sites ==
=== The Castle Semple Collegiate church ===
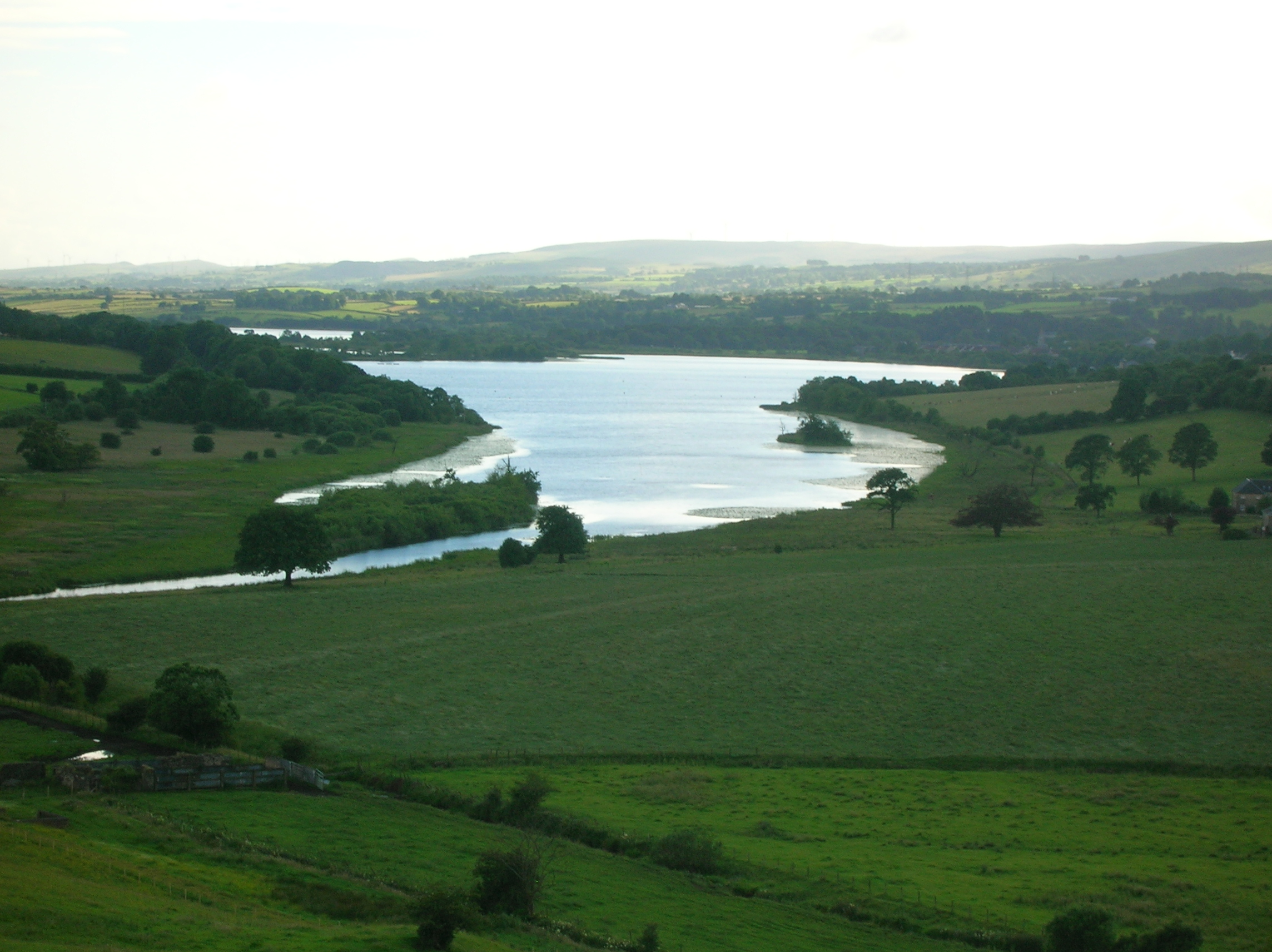
Castle Semple from the 'Temple' hill.

This Church was founded and endowed; it stands near where the original Castle Semple once stood. Castle Semple was a Collegiate church, which means that it was administered and served by a college of canons or prebendaries, presided over by a dean or provost. Collegiate churches were often supported by lands held by the church, endowed here in 1504 by John, 1st Lord Sempill. The church is built in a late Gothic style with a rectangular body and square tower at the west end and a three sided apse at the east end. The Church is in the care of Historic Scotland.

=== The Castle Semple Temple ===
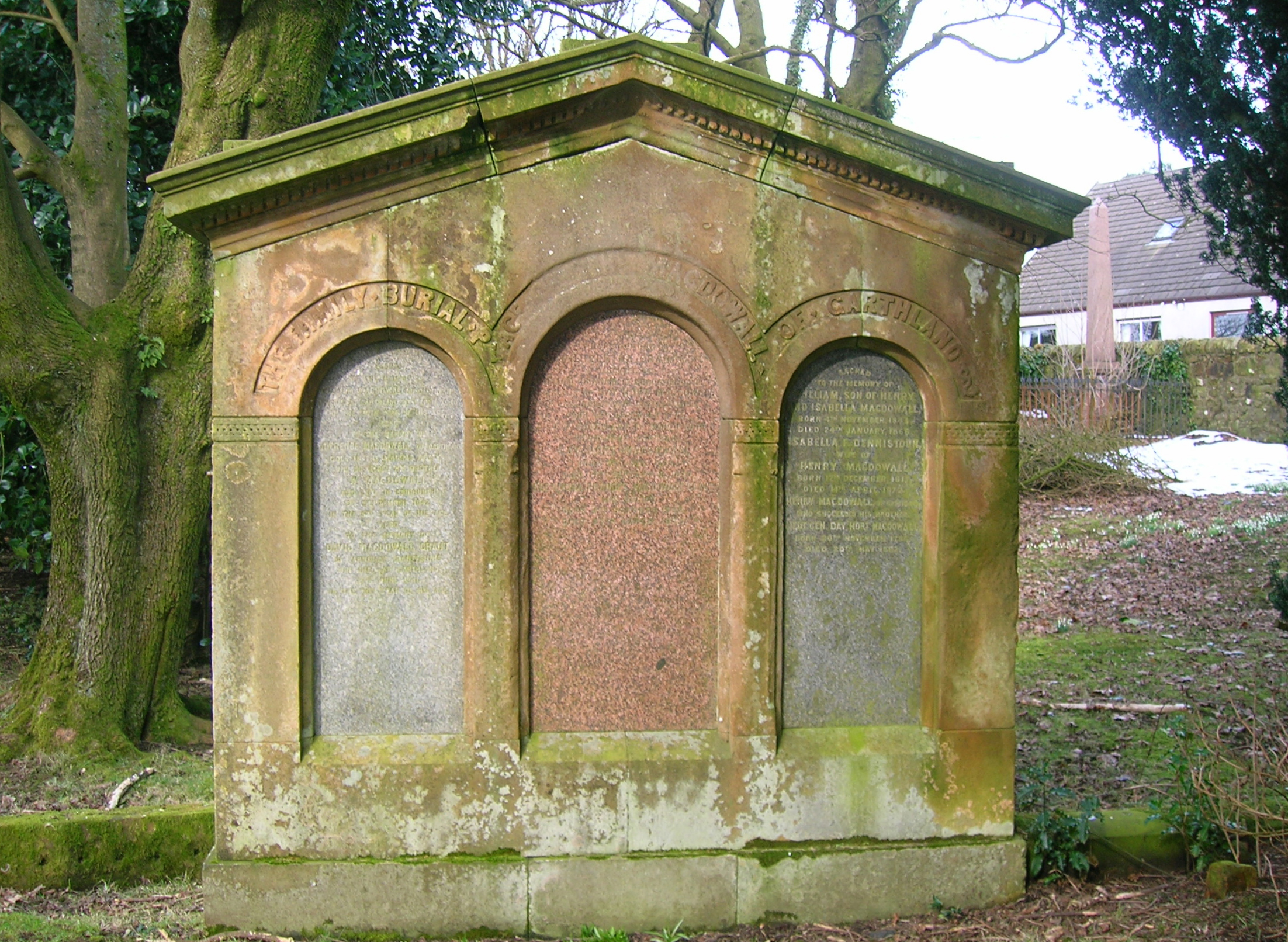
Memorial to the MacDowalls of Garthland, latter day owners of the Castle Semple estate.

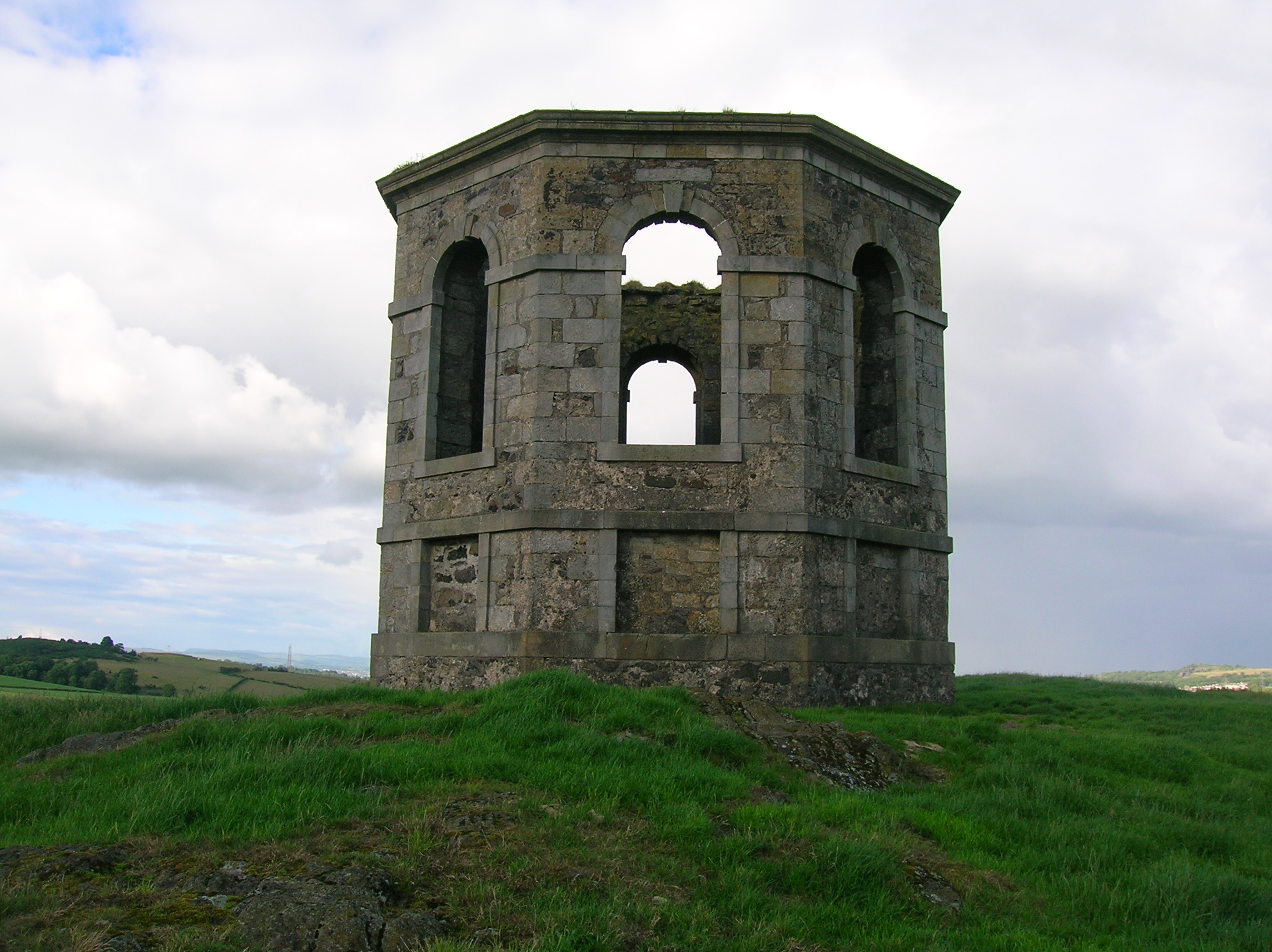
The Castle Semple temple.

The small temple building or folly on the Kenmure Hill knoll to the northern end of Castle Semple loch is one of the few remains of the Castle Semple estate. Col. William MacDowell was responsible for the 'Temple' and also for building of Castle Semple House, which was destroyed by fire in 1935. All that remains of this 900-acre (360 ha) estate is the folly, a walled garden and a pair of gate arches.

=== Loch Thom and the Greenock cut ===
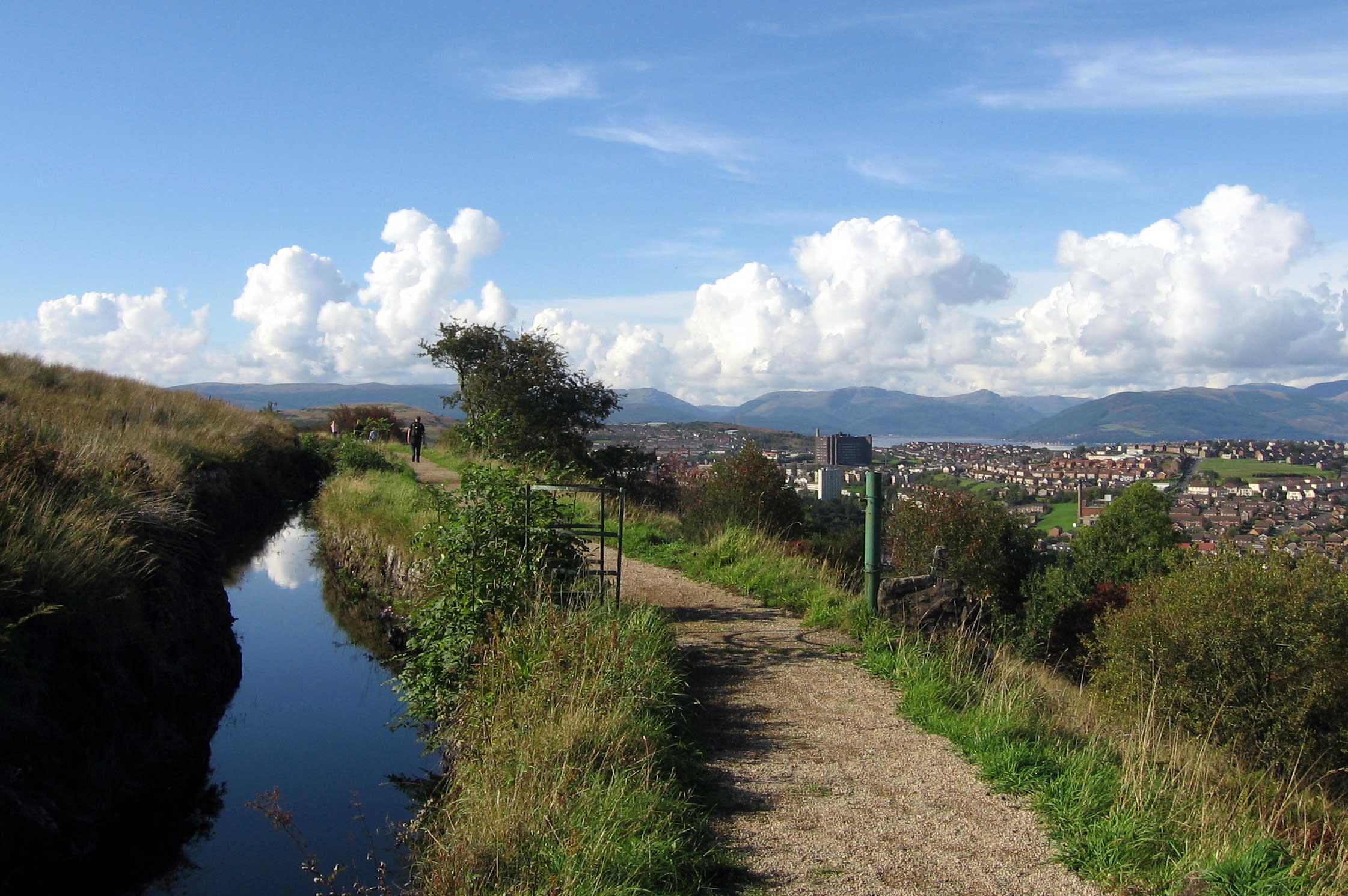
Looking back along The Cut from Overton.

A freshwater loch known as Shaws Water used to exist at a level high above Greenock until the civil engineer Robert Thom prepared a scheme to turn this into a reservoir, subsequently named after him as Loch Thom. He also created the aqueduct which became known as "The Cut", the whole scheme officially opening on 16 April 1827. The aqueduct supplied both a dependable flow and a good quality of water to the town for both domestic and business purposes.

Leaving Loch Thom at Cornalees, The Cut, with its footpath, runs westward and then turns northward as it follows the contour of Dunrod Hill which it follows round until running directly above the town of Greenock at Overton, having come a distance of 5 1/2 miles (9 km). It collects some of the water from streams that cross its path, and a series of sluice gates incorporate an ingenious automatic way of releasing surplus water.

=== Muirshiel Barytes Mine ===
Seams of Baryte minerals were found in three gullies about 2 kilometres (1.2 mi) north of Hill of Stake, cut into the slope by tributaries of the River Calder, Renfrewshire. Small-scale open cast mining of the baryte began around the mid 18th century, with horizontal tunnels or adits cut to follow the seams of the mineral. Between 1859 and 1920, production was 17,678 long tons (17,962 t). A track was formed running around 4 kilometres (2.5 mi) downhill to a grinding mill sited on the River Calder, where the mineral was dressed or processed. Stables and houses for the workers were built adjacent to the mill, and a bridge crossing the river connected by a lane down to Lochwinnoch. By about 1918 the mine was run by the Muirshiels Mineral Co. of Lochwinnoch, but production ceased in 1920.

Keir and Cawder Ltd. and James Millar Son and Co. Ltd. reopened the mine in 1942. They formed the Muirshiel Barytes Co. in 1947, and constructed new shafts to depths between 64 metres (210 ft) and 64 metres (210 ft). This gave access to veins of baryte of a finer quality, which was taken directly to a dressing plant in Glasgow. Production was 1,580 long tons (1,610 t) in 1944, rising to 16,987 long tons (17,260 t) in 1949. Up to this stage there was no electricity at the mine, and minerals were transported in wagons on rails, moved to the surface by human or horse power. The workforce came from Lochwinnoch and Kilbirnie. In 1960 the mine was taken over by Anglo Austral Mines Ltd., and electrical power was introduced to power winding gear for the wagons and lift them to the surface, where the barytes was loaded into lorries. In 1962 Rio Tinto Zinc became the operator. A new dressing plant was constructed just downhill from the mine, to process output from a lower quality vein. At this time up to 48 people from Lochwinnoch and Kilbirnie worked at the mine, including 11 skilled miners, each with an assistant, as well as maintenance and surface workers. Annual production reached a peak of 16,987 long tons (17,260 t) in 1964. Production ended on 5 September 1969.

When the country park was formed, the Muirshiel Visitor Centre was built a short distance downhill from the pre-1920 site of the mine. The original workings and bridge over the river have fallen into ruin, the track over a new bridge constructed nearby in the 1960s gives access for walkers. Part of the site is used for off-road vehicle driving instruction. At the mine itself, a seismometer transmits measurements by radio to the British Geological Survey

== See also ==
- Castle Semple Loch
- Eglinton Country Park
- Hill of Stake
- Kilbirnie Loch
- Duchal Moor Railway

== Views of Clyde Muirshiel - 2007 ==
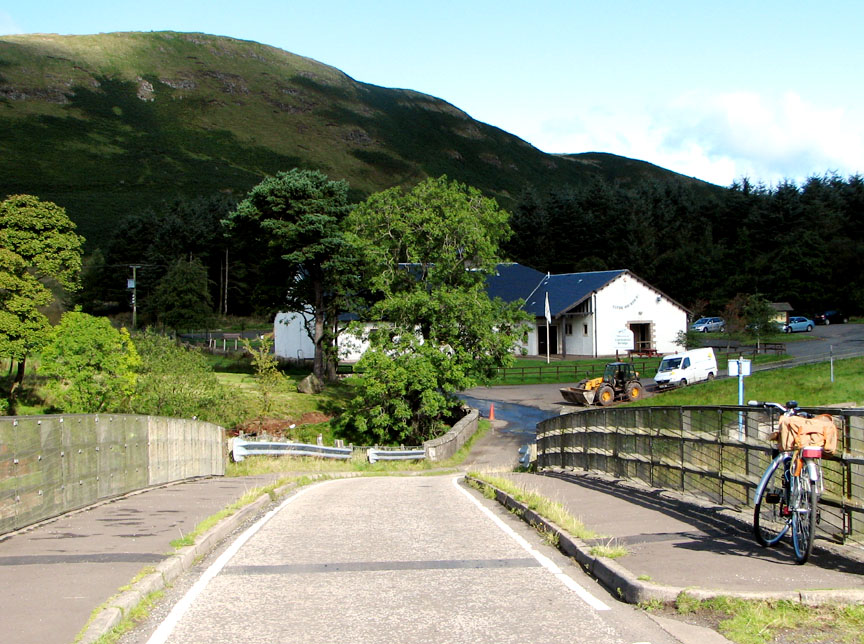
Cornalees Visitors Centre.

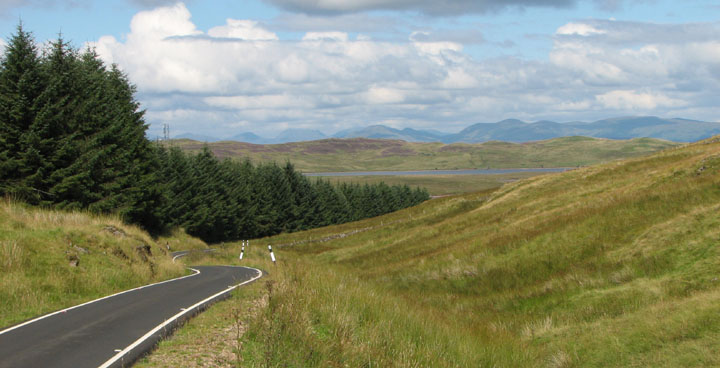
A view of Loch Thom.

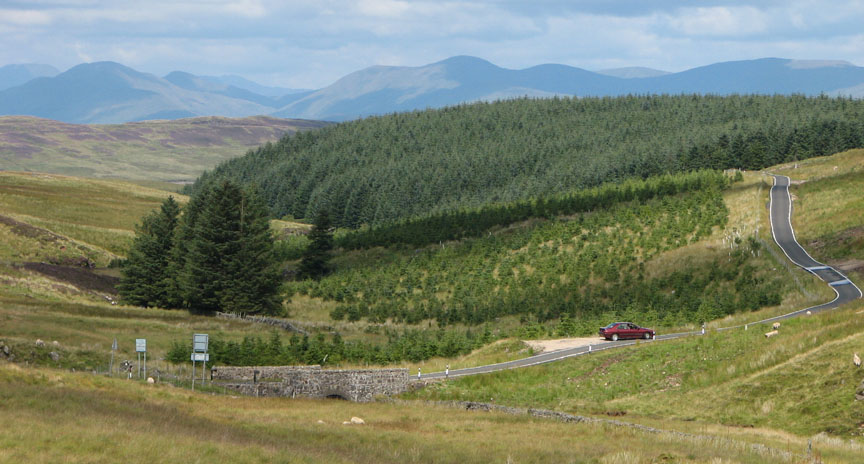
Rottenburn Bridge.

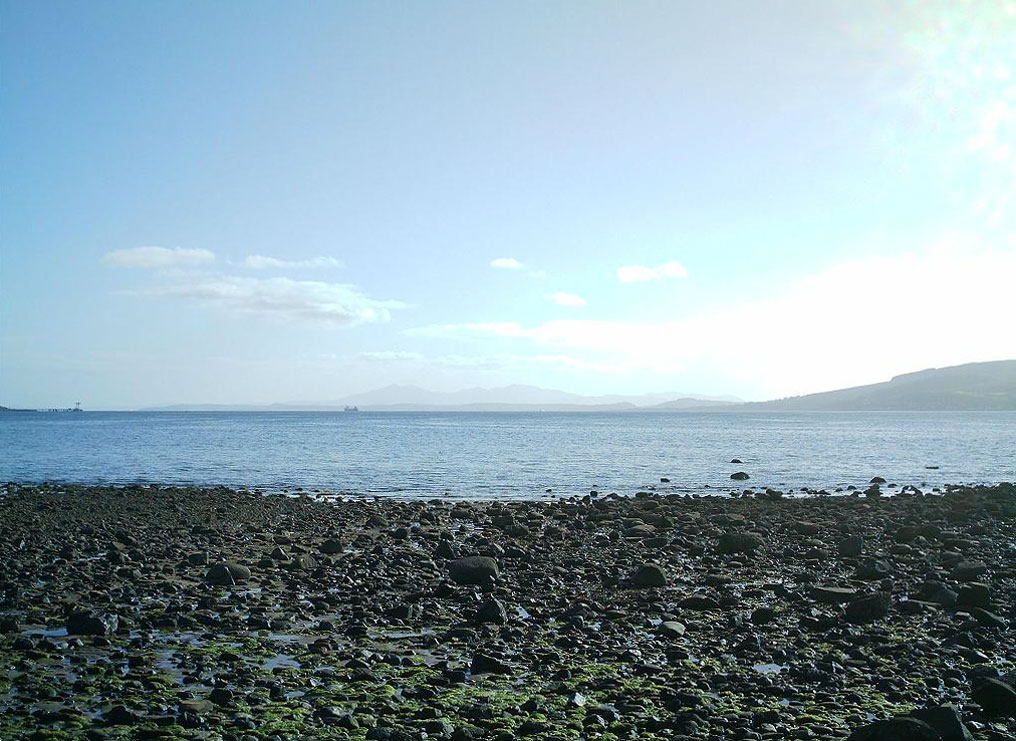
The view south from Lunderston looking towards the Isle of Arran.

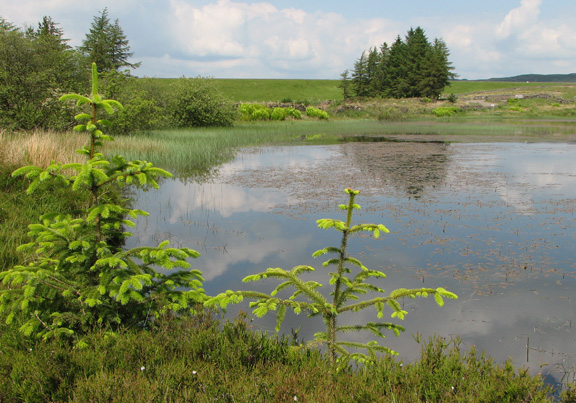
Gryfe Reservoir, Close to Loch Thom.

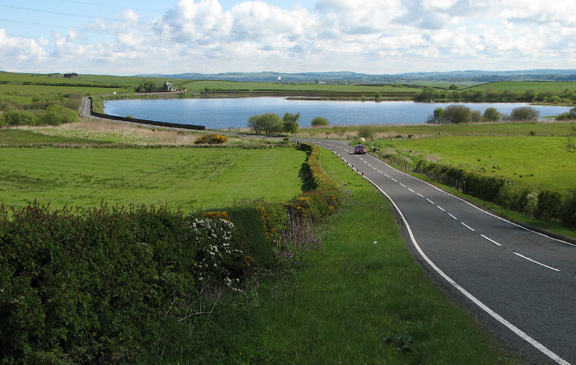
Munnoch Reservoir on the B780 road.

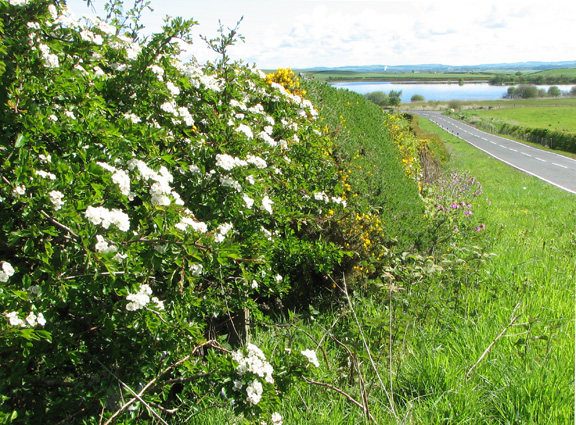
Wildflowers near Munnoch Reservoir on the B780.

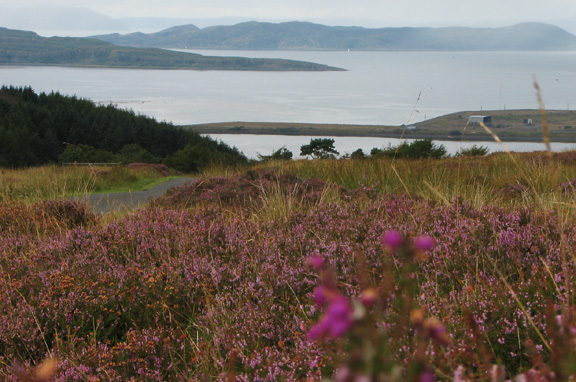
The view from Fairlie Moor road across to Arran.

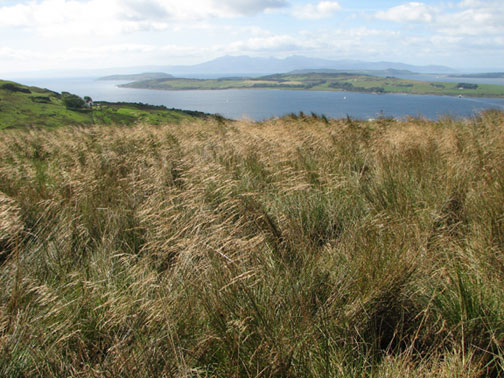
The view of Arran & Cumbrae from the hills above Largs.

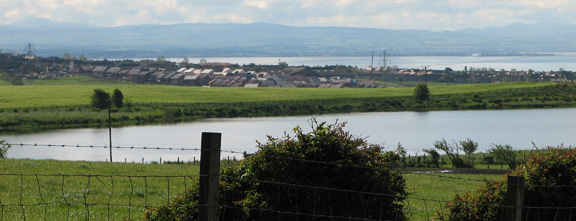
Mill Glen Reservoir on the B780.

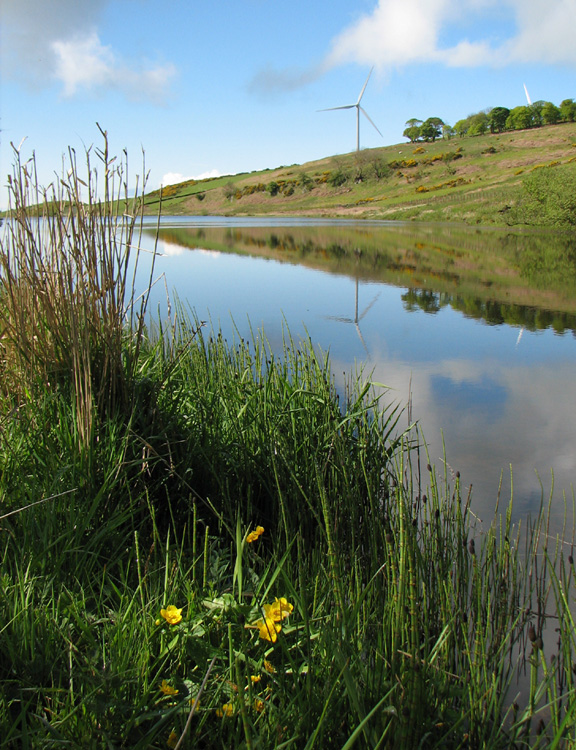
Busbie Muir Reservoir on the B780.

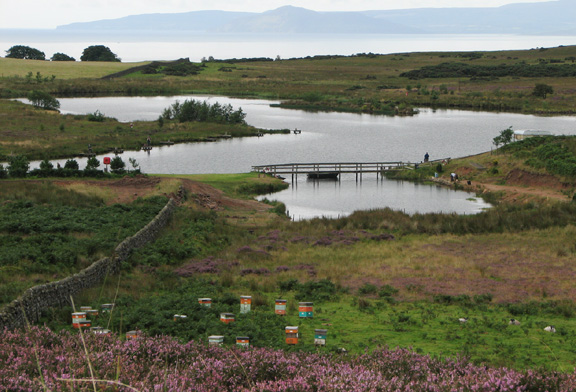
Glenburn Reservoir on the Fairlie Moor road (Fairlie to Dalry), about 1 mile (1.6 km) east from the A78 road.

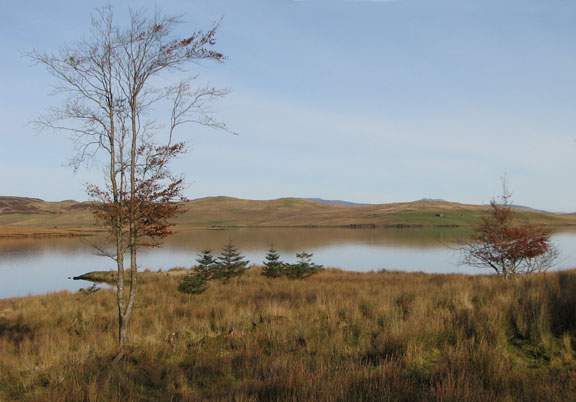
A view of Loch Thom in autumn.

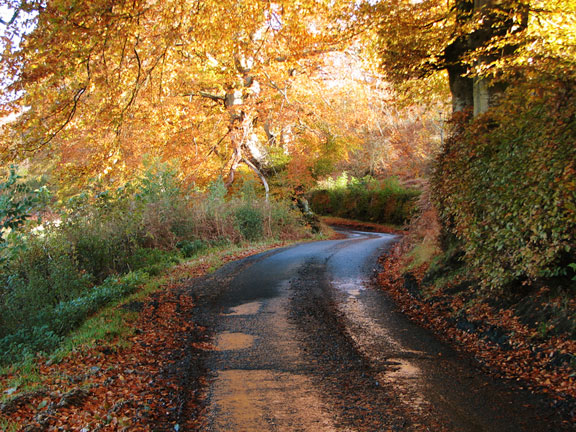
The Brisbane Glen road in autumn.

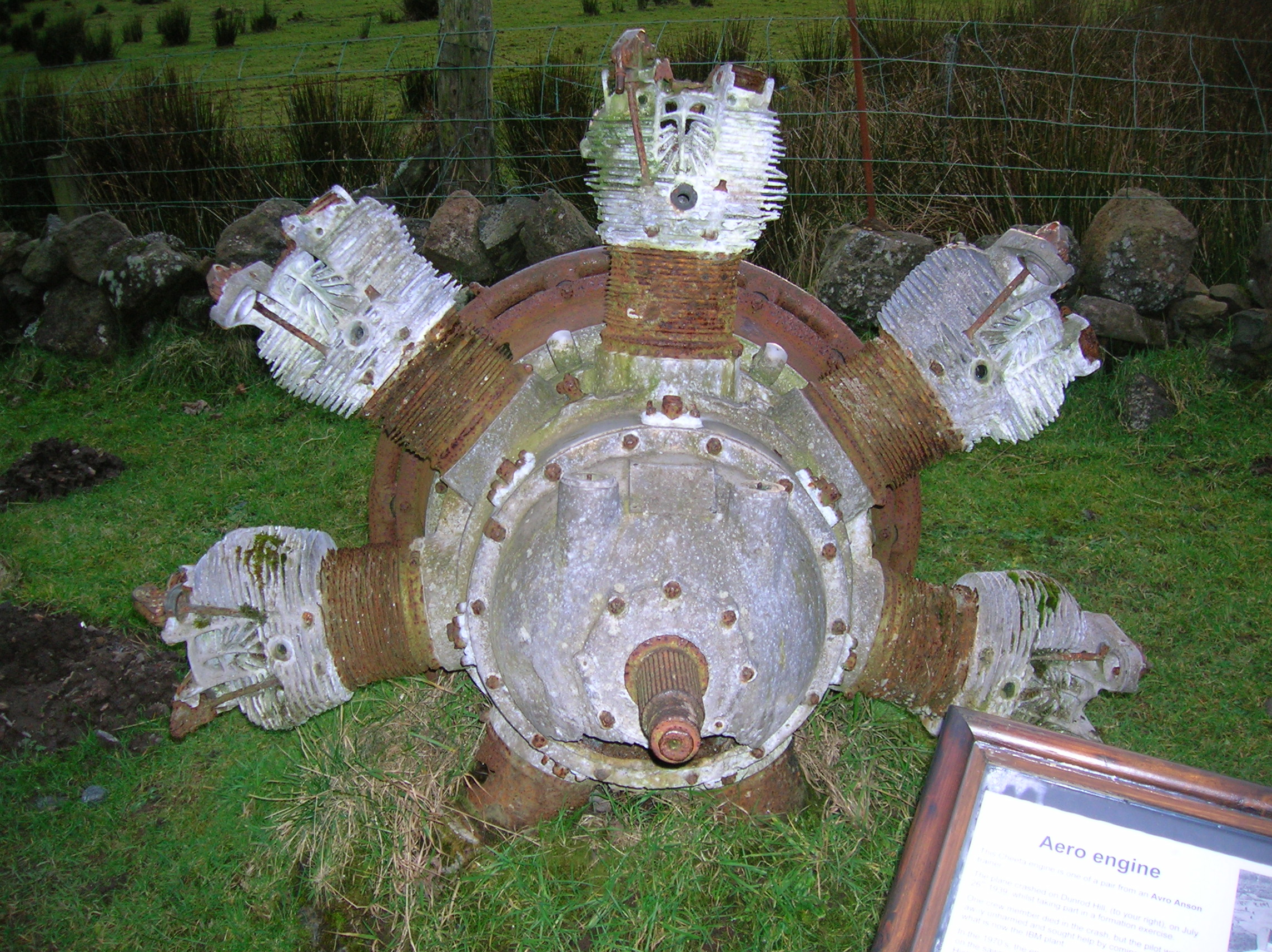
The engine from an Avro Anson which crashed on the north side of Dunrod Hill is now displayed in the Cut Centre car park.

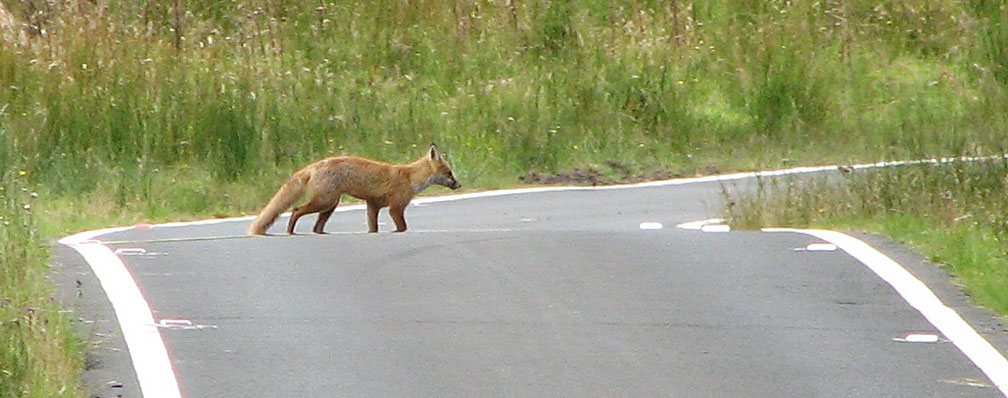
A fox near Loch Thom
