= Hill of Stake =

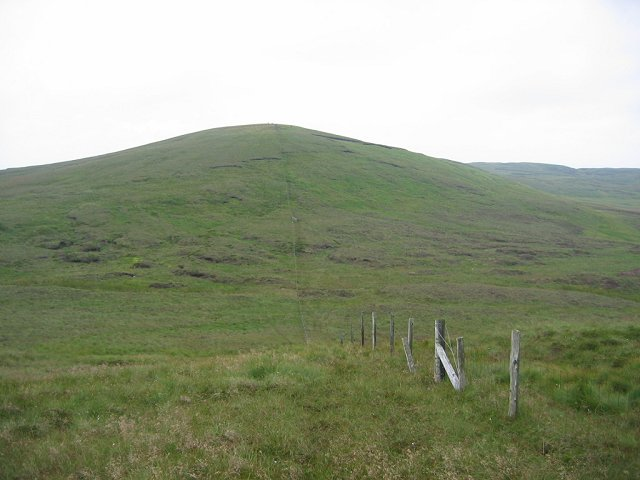

Highest point
- Elevation: 522 m (1,713 ft)
- Prominence: 489
- Listing: Marilyn
- Coordinates: 55.829203°N 4.758795°W

Geography
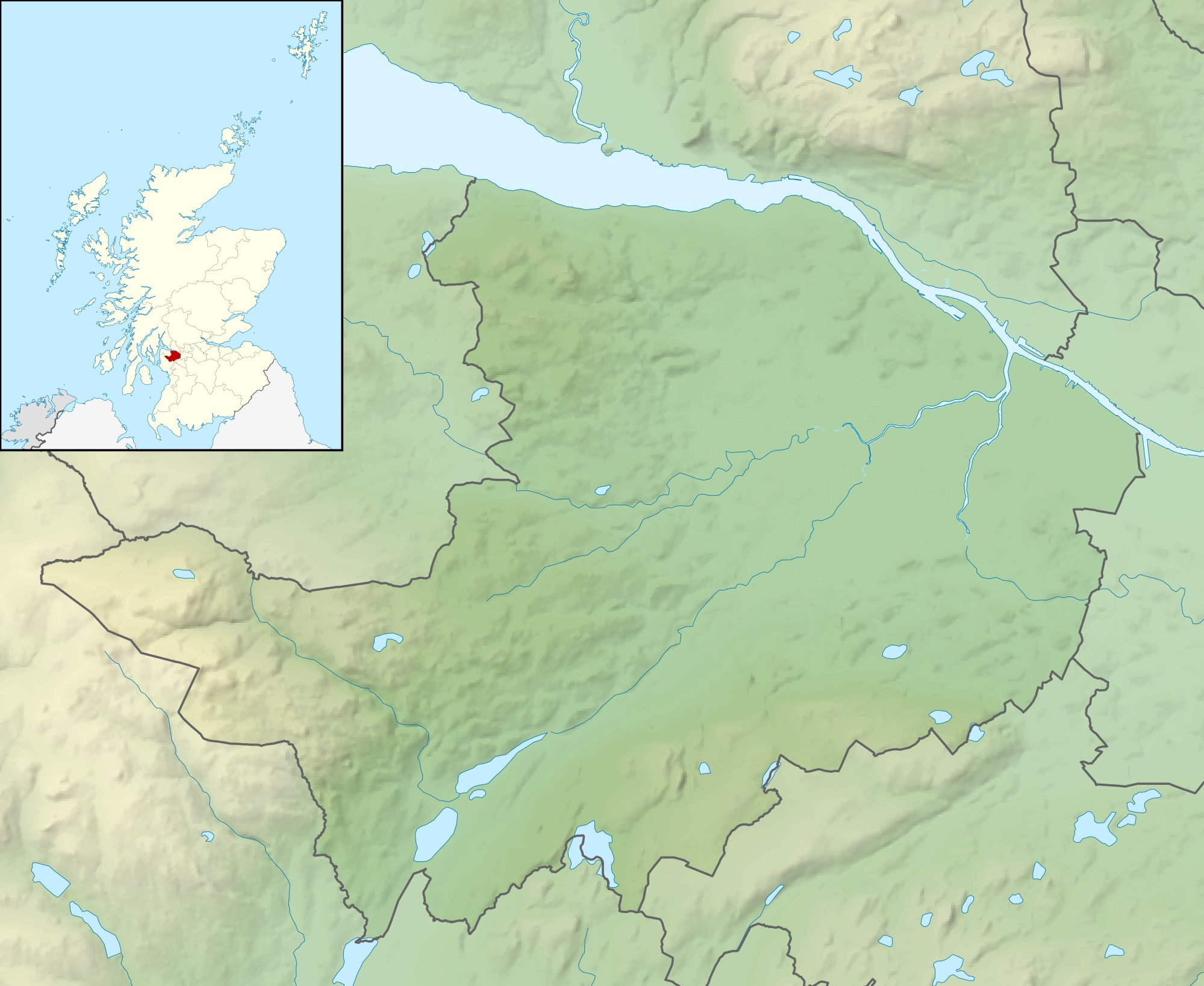
- Location within Renfrewshire Location within Scotland
- Location: North Ayrshire and Renfrewshire, Scotland
- OS grid: NS273630
- Topo map: OS Landranger 63

Hill of Stake is a hill on the boundary between North Ayrshire and Renfrewshire, Scotland.

== Geography ==
The hill is 522 metres (1,713 feet) high and is the highest point of the relatively low-lying county of Renfrewshire and indeed the entire Clyde Muirshiel Regional Park of which it is a part, having a considerable topographic isolation.

== History ==
Around the hill in the past several planes crashed due to bad weather conditions; among them in 1938 is recorded a crash of a Spartan Cruiser and in 1947 of a Seafire.
