= Lunderston Bay =

Coordinates: 55.92091°N 4.87736°W

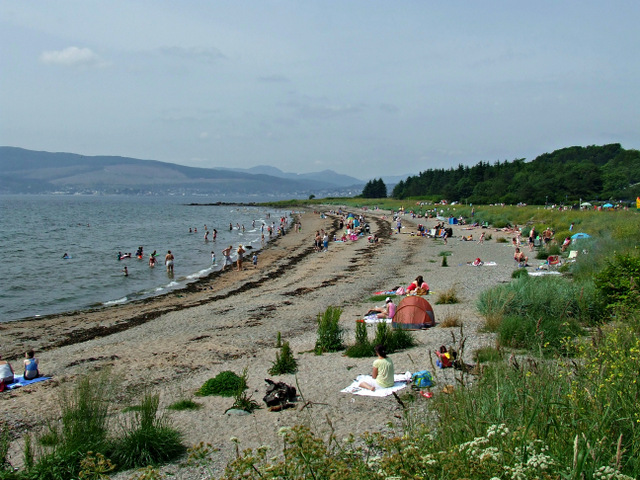
- Beach at the north end of the bay

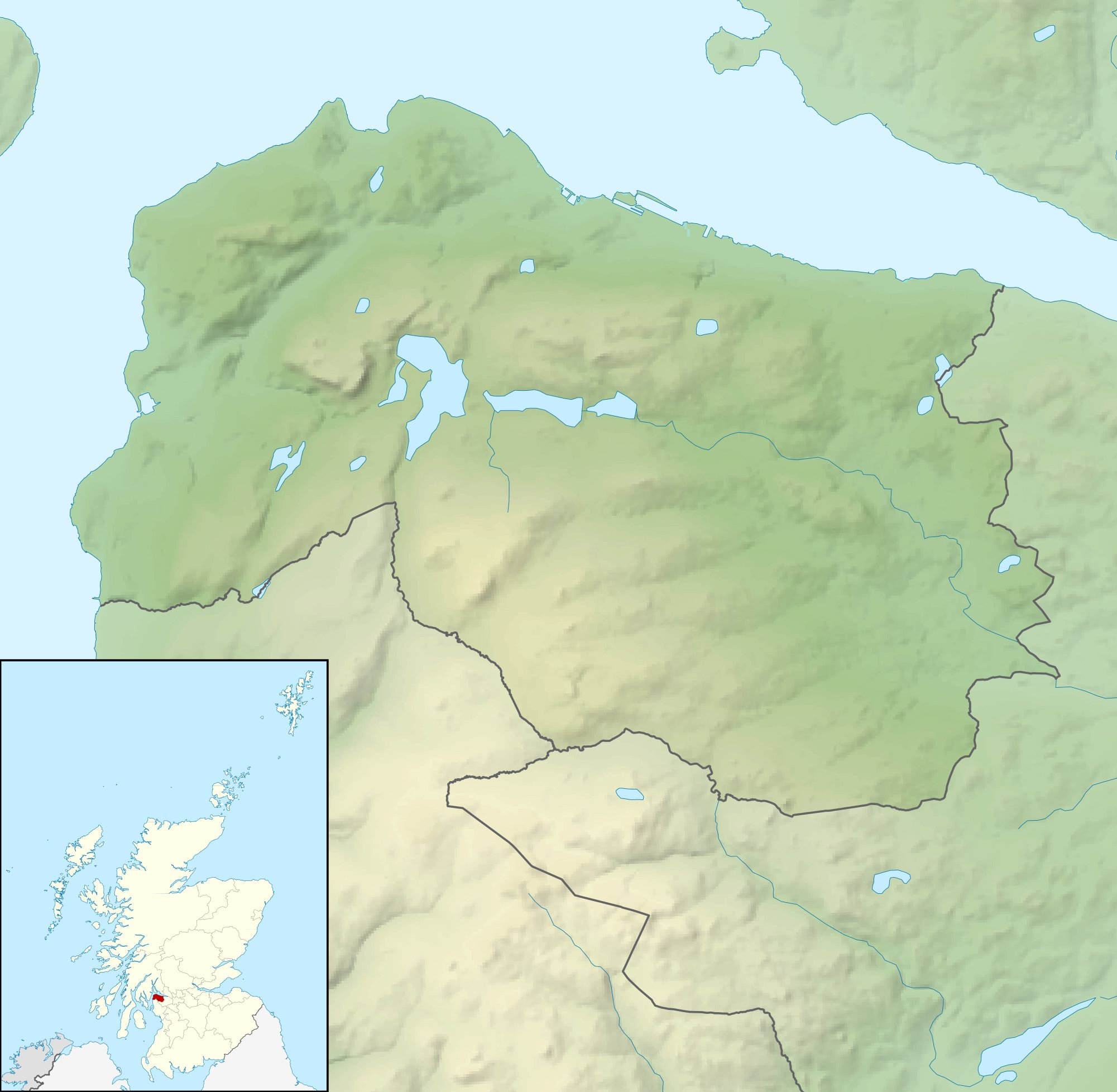
- Location within Inverclyde
- OS grid reference: NS 2021 7400
- Council area: Inverclyde
- Country: Scotland
- Sovereign state: United Kingdom

Lunderston Bay is located on the east coast of the Firth of Clyde in Inverclyde, by the A770 road approximately midway between the town of Gourock and the village of Inverkip.

The bay measures approximately one mile (1.5 kilometres) from north to south at its widest point. At low tide, most of the shore at the south end of the bay becomes exposed, revealing rocks and shingle. The tidal effect at the sandy beach at the north end of the bay is less visible. The Lunderston Burn enters the Firth of Clyde at the north end of the bay.

== Beach and facilities ==
There is a popular sandy beach, picnic area with numerous tables and a wheelchair accessible playground at the northern end of the bay, where toilets and a car park are also located (the north end of the bay is within Clyde Muirshiel Regional Park, but the south end is not). Lunderston Bay is a designated bathing water, with generally good water conditions during the bathing season. There are lifebuoy stations at the beach, but there are no lifeguards.

The junctions from the A770 Cloch Road to the bay car park and the garden centre were improved in early 2019. The improvements included the creation of bus stop bays and islands to provide a safer crossing point for pedestrians between the two sites. Bus times are available from the Traveline Scotland web site.

== Coastal path ==
The coastal path which runs through the bay area is part of the National Cycle Network. Route 753 starts at Route 75 in the centre of Gourock and continues south through the bay and Ardgowan Estate to Kip Marina and Inverkip where it terminates at the village war memorial. Eventually the path will continue to join the existing southern stretch of Route 753 which runs from Seamill to Ardrossan. The path follows the shoreline for most of the length of the bay and it is popular with walkers, joggers, cyclists and dog walkers all year round.

The coastal path at the bay is part of the Inverclyde Core Paths network (Sections 1B & 1C).

The path is also included in the Clyde Coastal Path (CCP), which itself is part of the Firth o Clyde Rotary Trail (FoCRT), which is a waymarked trail forming part of the more extensive International Appalachian Trail Scotland. The CCP to the south of the Erskine Bridge is looked after by the Rotary Club of Gourock, who provide signposts along the route.

== Wildlife ==
Gannets from the 47-mile-distant (76-kilometre) Ailsa Craig can be seen diving for fish near the bay. Seasonal visiting birds include occasional Canada geese plus regular curlews and oyster catchers which can be seen foraging for lugworms and shellfish on the waterline. In winter, grebes, divers and other wildfowl can be found in numbers on the shoreline. At the quieter south end of the bay, grey seals, red shanks, cormorants, eiders and herons can be seen.

Lunderston Bay Wildlife Gallery

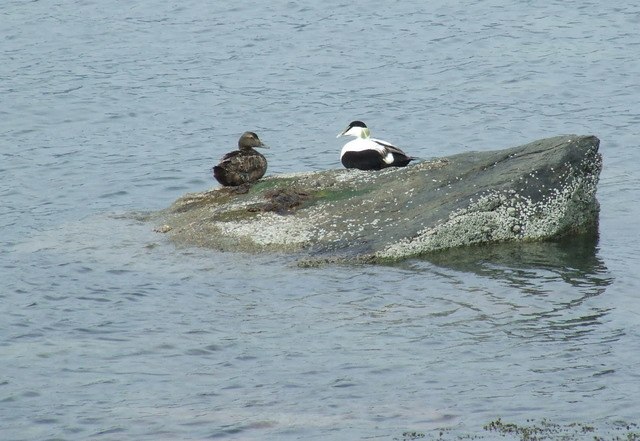
Eiders at Lunderston Bay

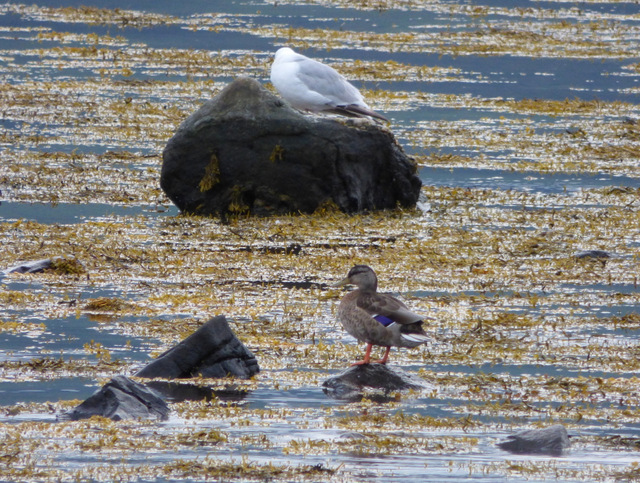
Mallard and Herring Gull at Lunderston Bay

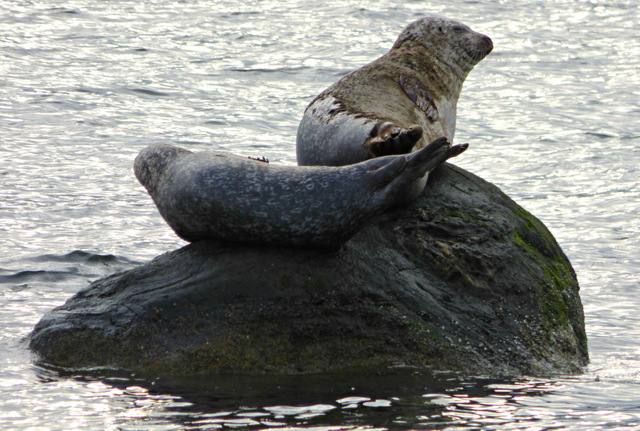
Seals at the south end of Lunderston Bay

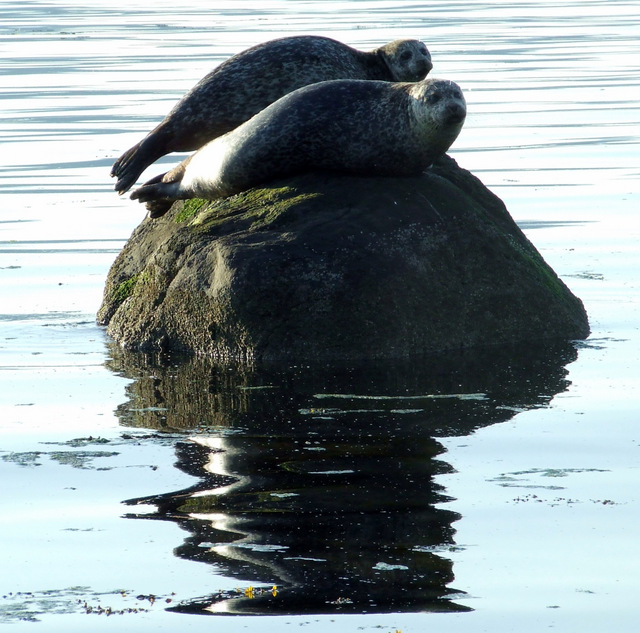
Seals at the south end of Lunderston Bay

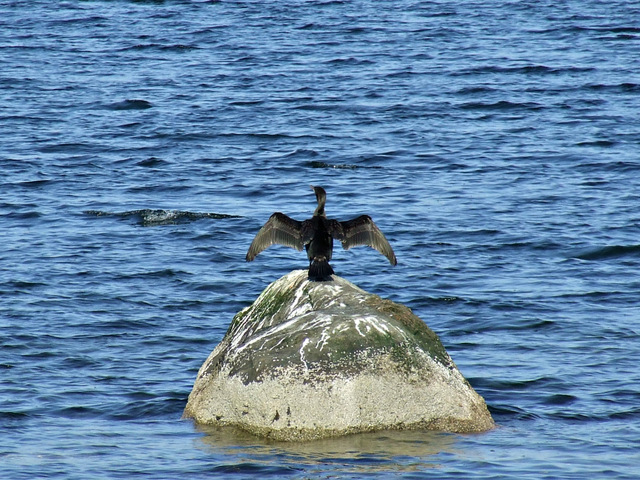
Cormorant at Lunderston Bay

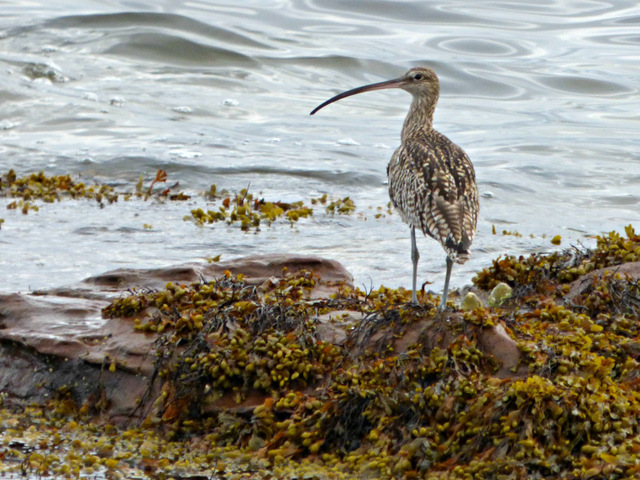
Curlew at Lunderston Bay

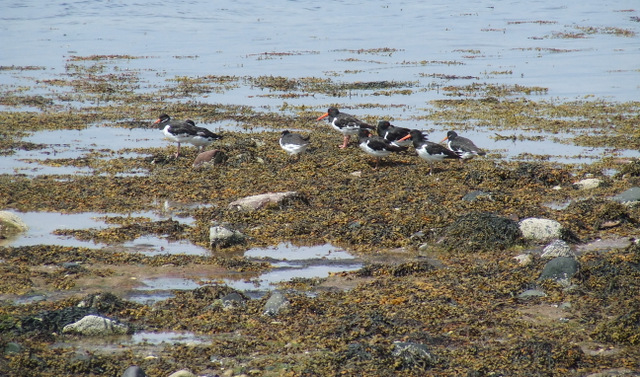
Oyster catchers at Lunderston Bay

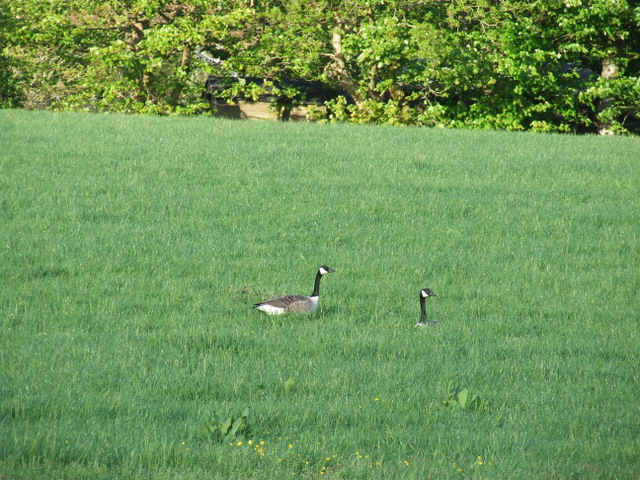
Canada Geese in a field at Lunderston Bay

== Cardwell Garden Centre ==
Located on the east side of the A770 Cloch Road, opposite the car park, this garden centre at Lunderston Bay is one of the biggest in the UK, extending to over 19 acres (8 hectares) of nursery and retail space, including a large restaurant. The centre has its own car park and toilet facilities, separate from those at the bay.

== Lunderston Bay Photo Gallery ==
Lunderston Bay Photo Gallery

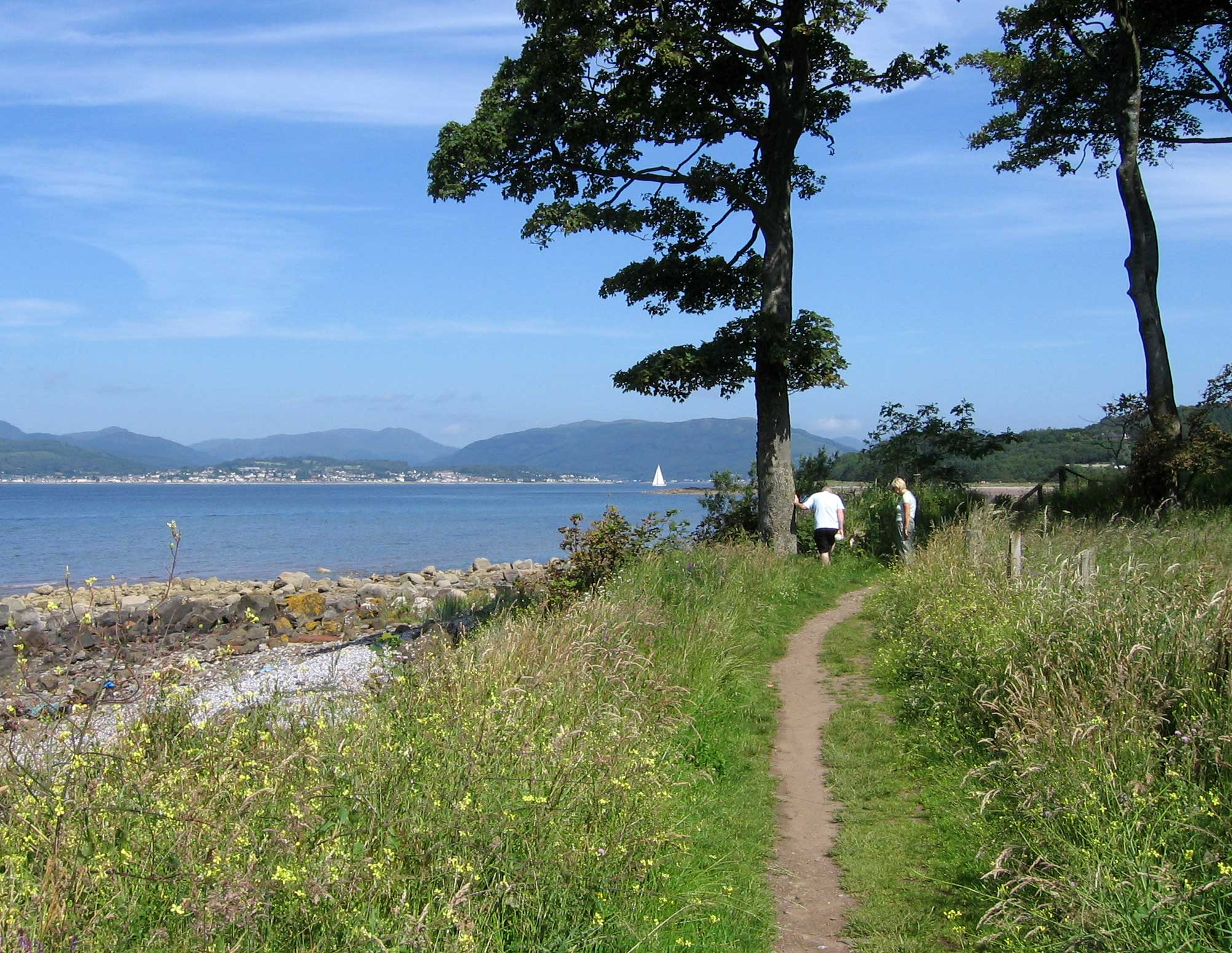
The coastal path before it was improved to a cycle path

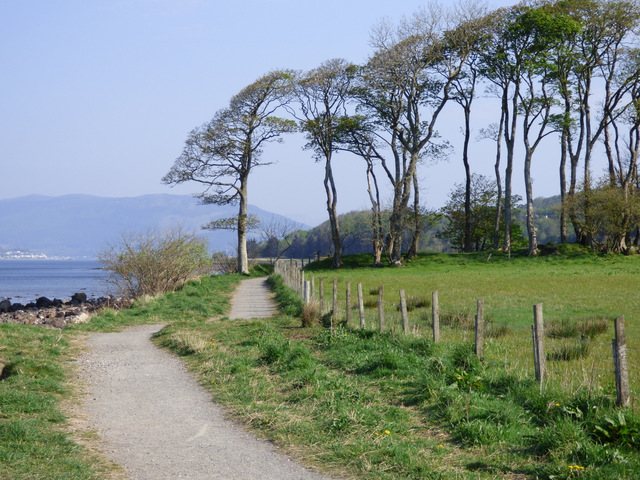
The coastal path after if was improved to a cycle path

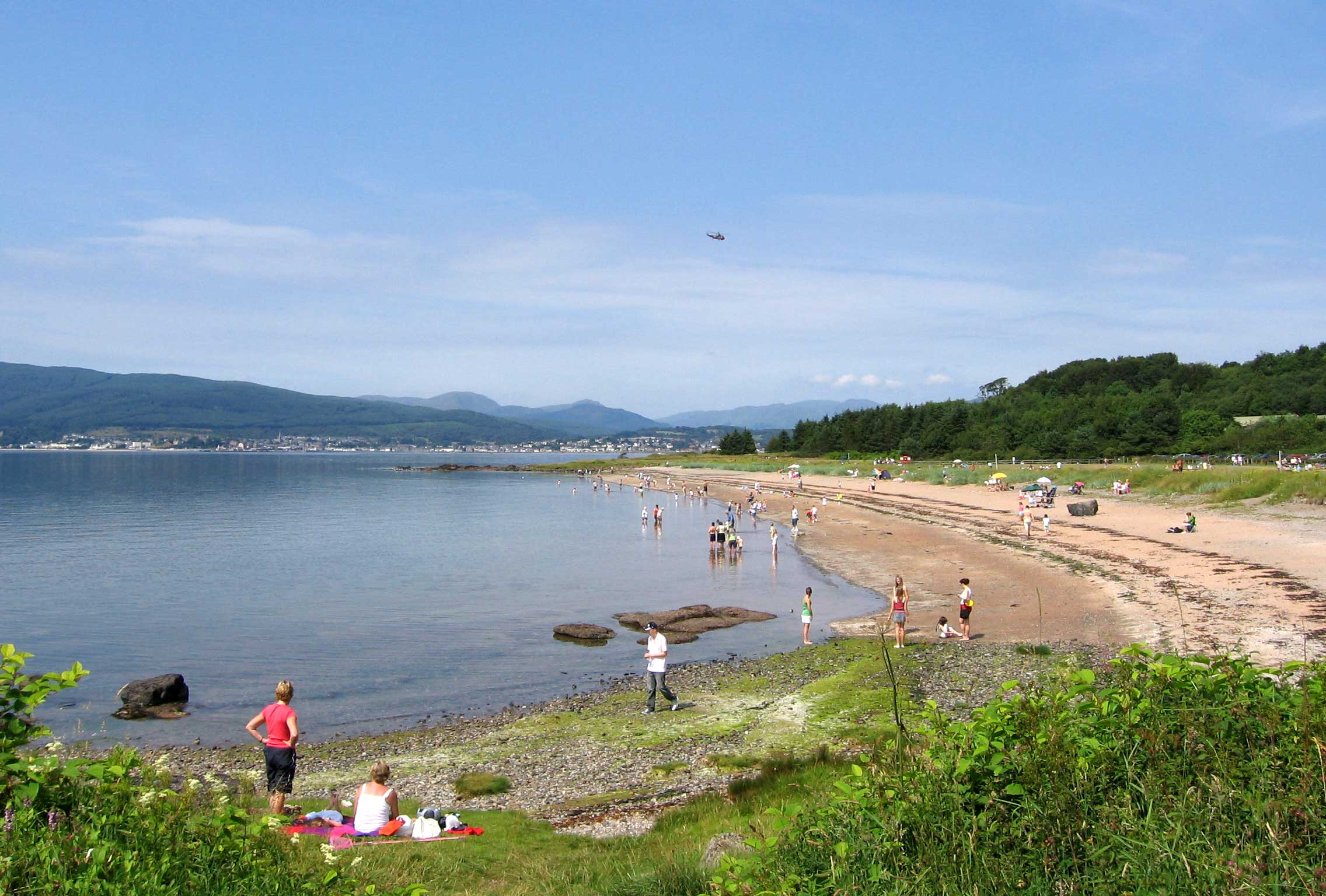
Beach and picnic area at the north end of the bay

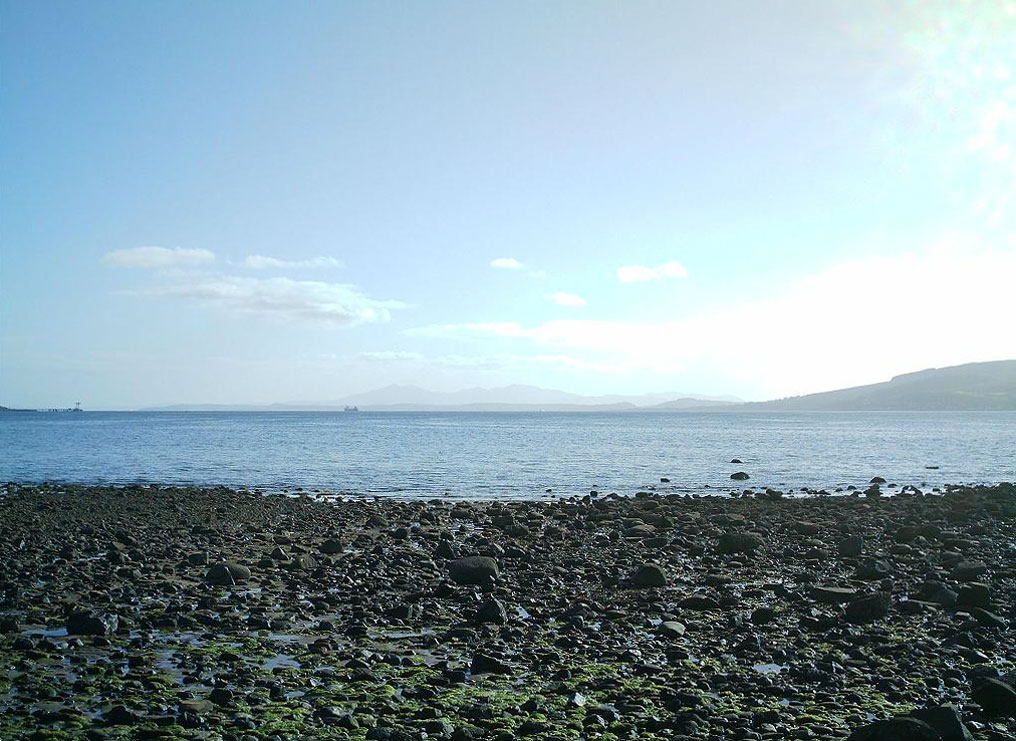
View south down the Clyde

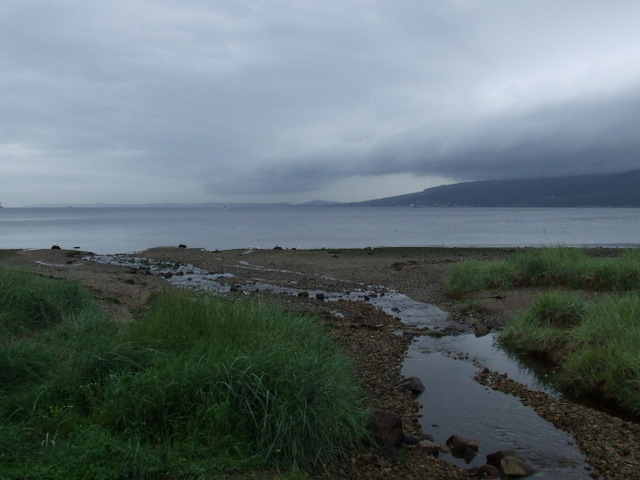
Lunderston Burn

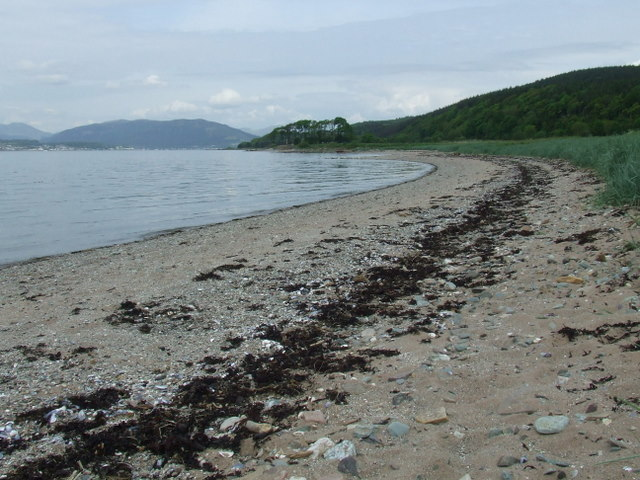
The south end of the bay

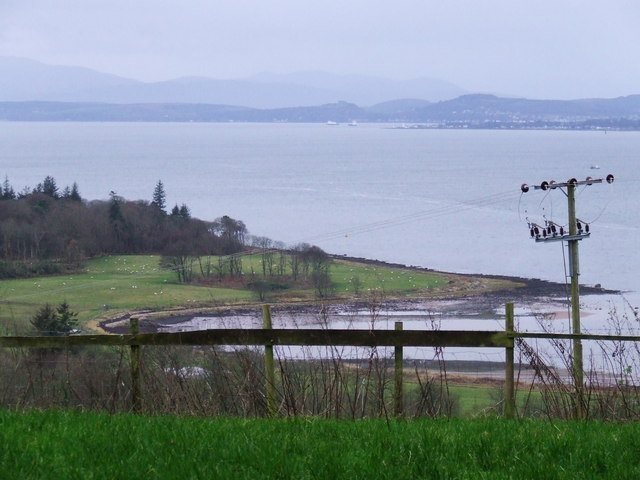
The south end of the bay, viewed from Lunderston Hill

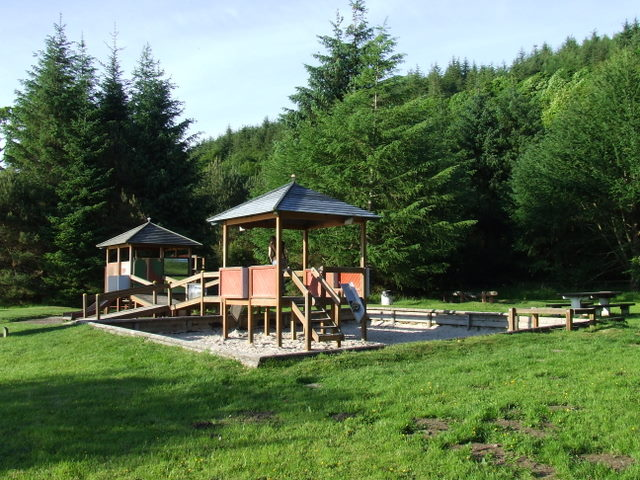
Accessible playground at the bay

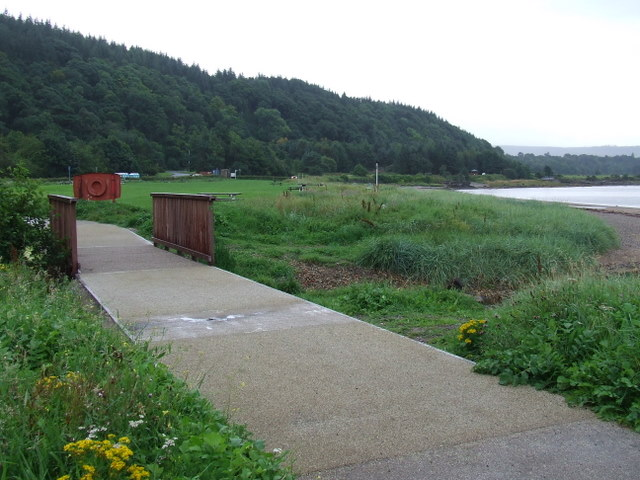
National Cycle Route 753 at the north end of the bay

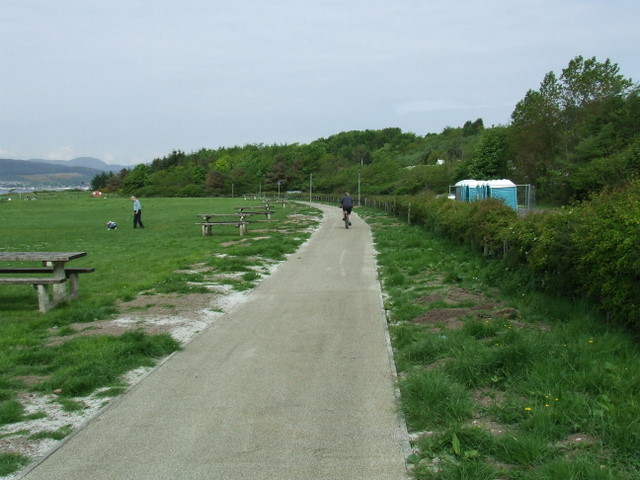
National Cycle Route 753 at the north end of the bay

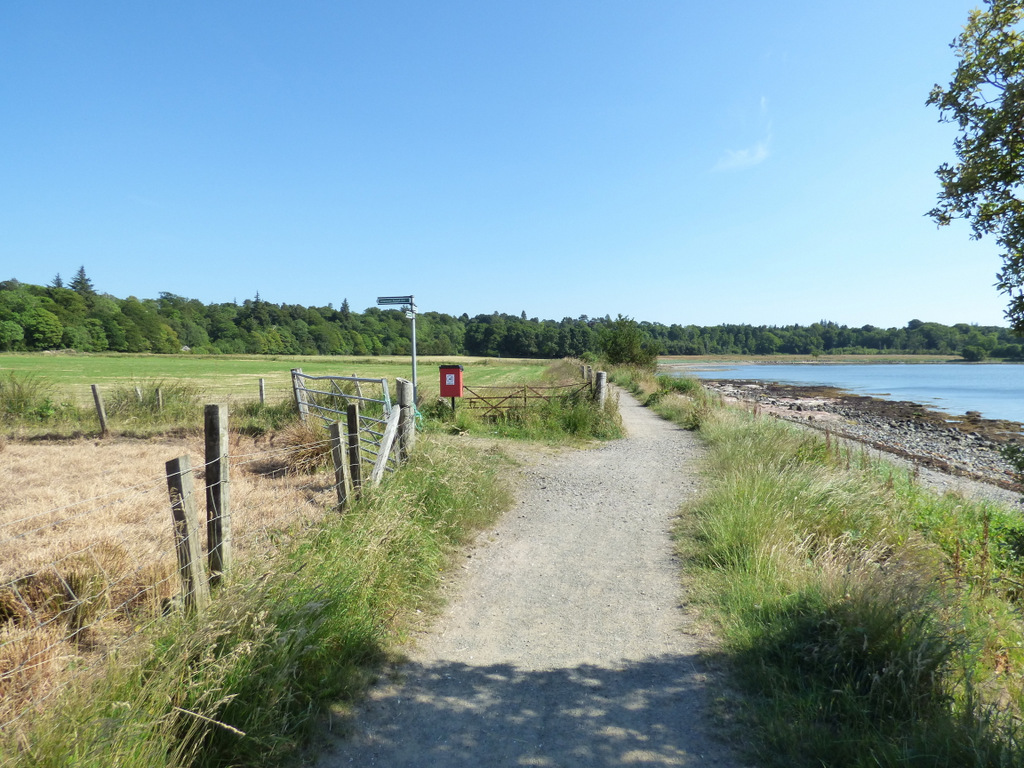
National Cycle Route 753 at the south end of the bay

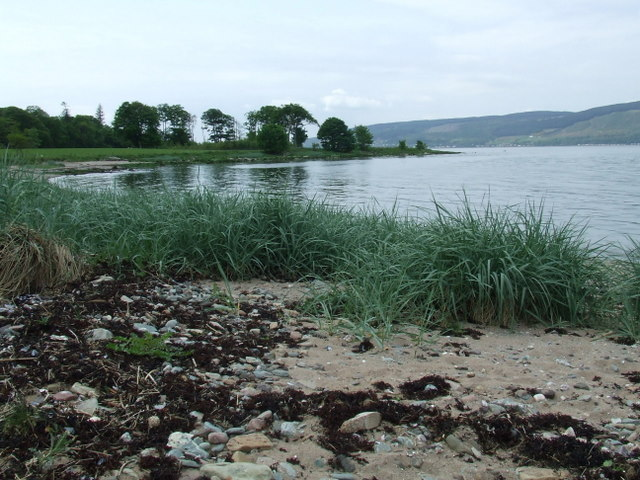
The point at the south end of the bay

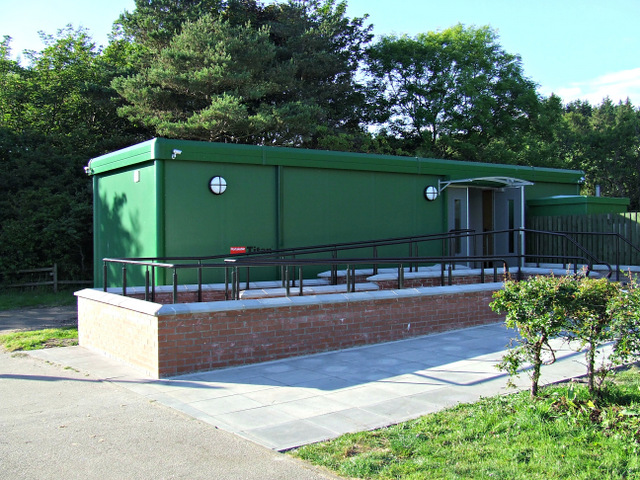
Lunderston Bay toilets

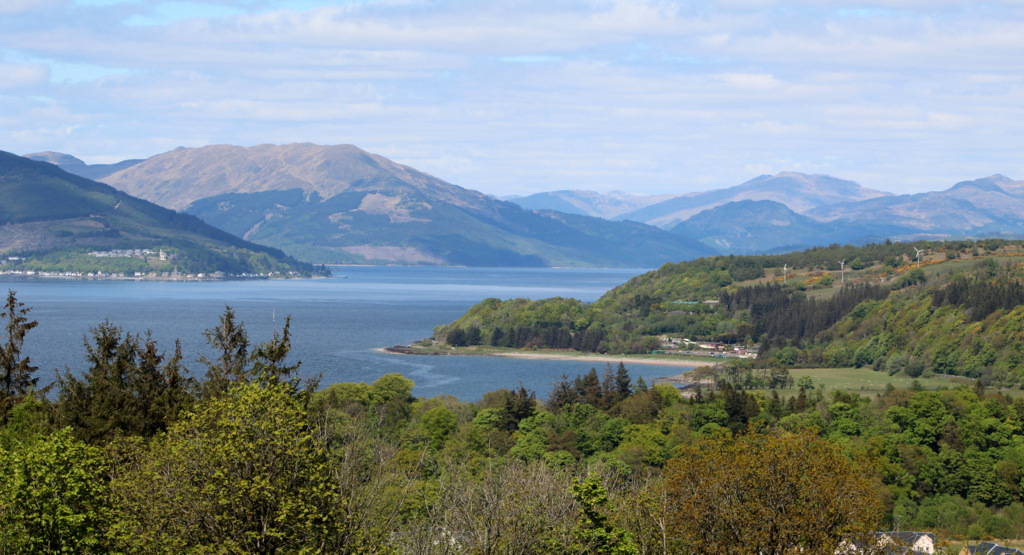
The north end of Lunderston Bay, viewed from Inverkip

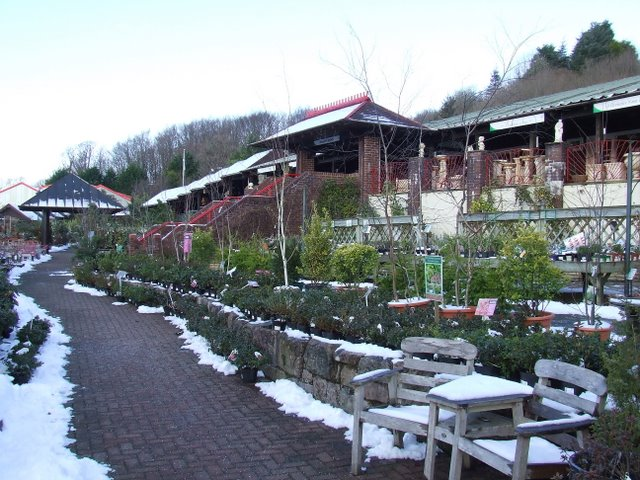
Cardwell Garden Centre

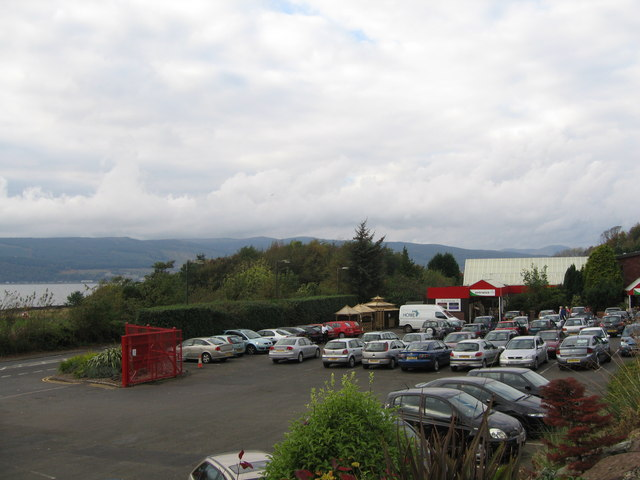
Cardwell Garden Centre car park
