= Loch Thom =

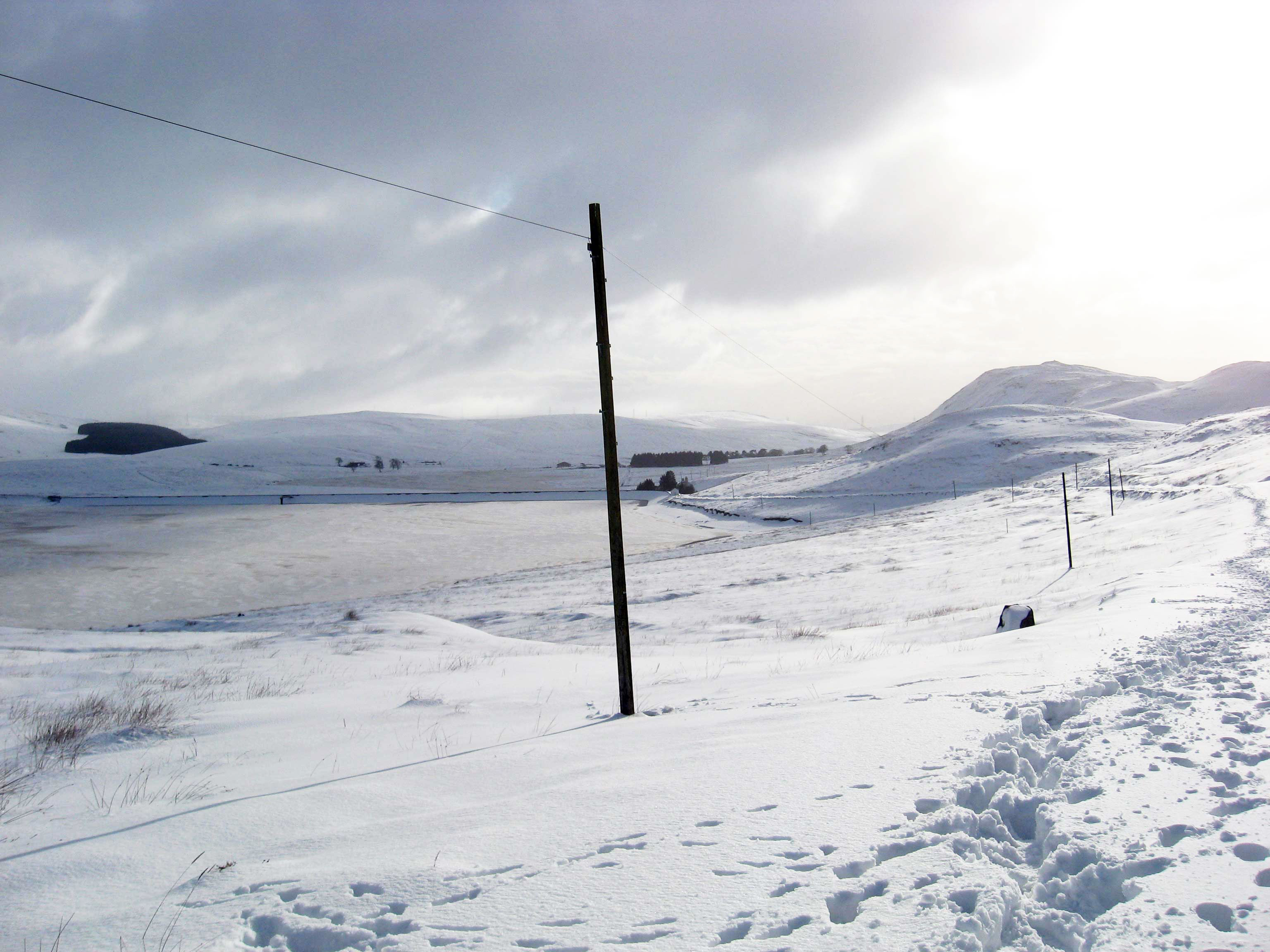
- Loch Thom, with Hillside Hill to the right.

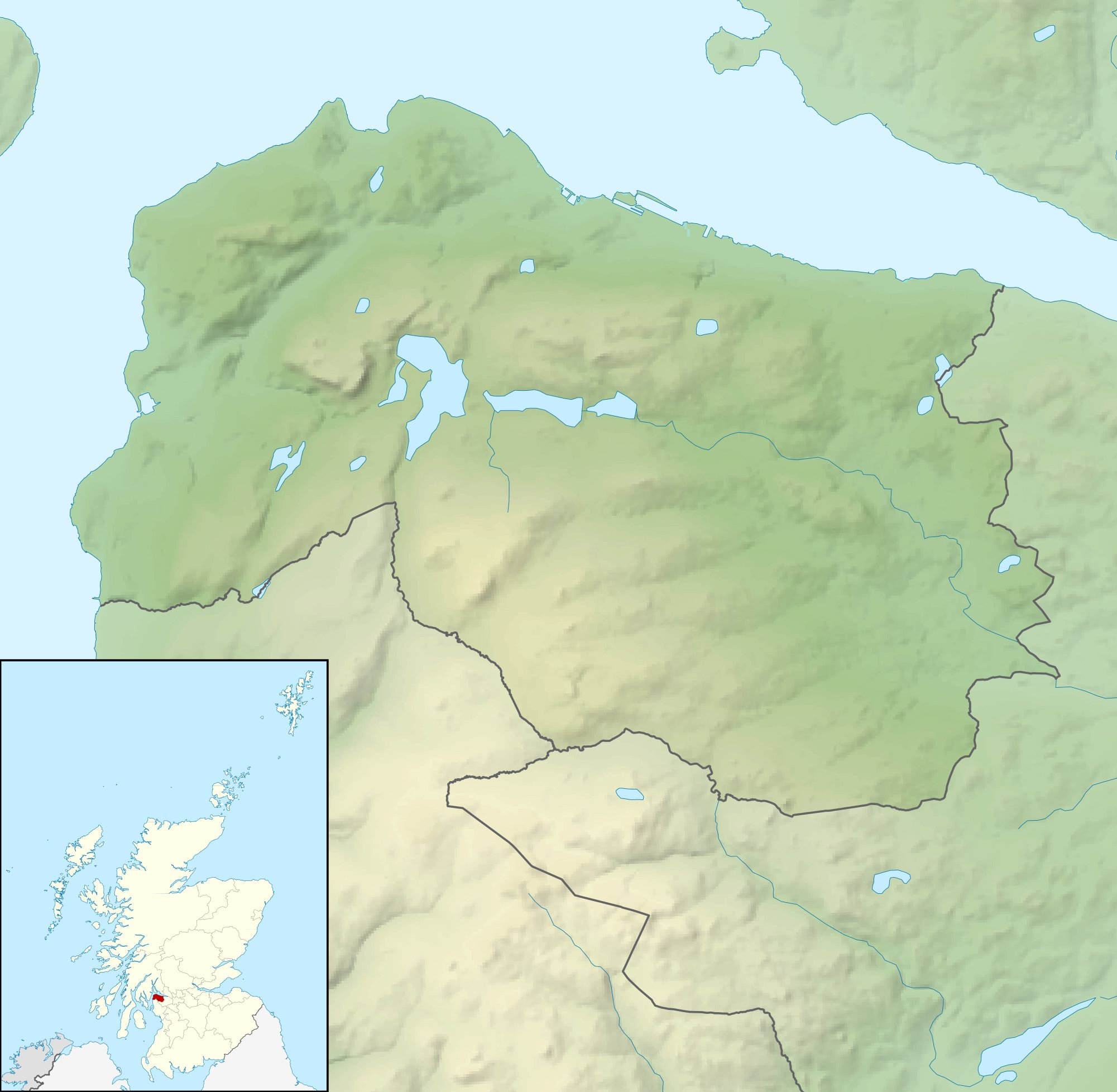
- Location within Inverclyde
- Location: Inverclyde
- Coordinates: 55°54′40″N 4°47′10″W
- Type: reservoir, Scotland
- Basin countries: United Kingdom
- Max. length: 2.4 km (1.5 mi)
- Surface elevation: 195 m (640 ft)

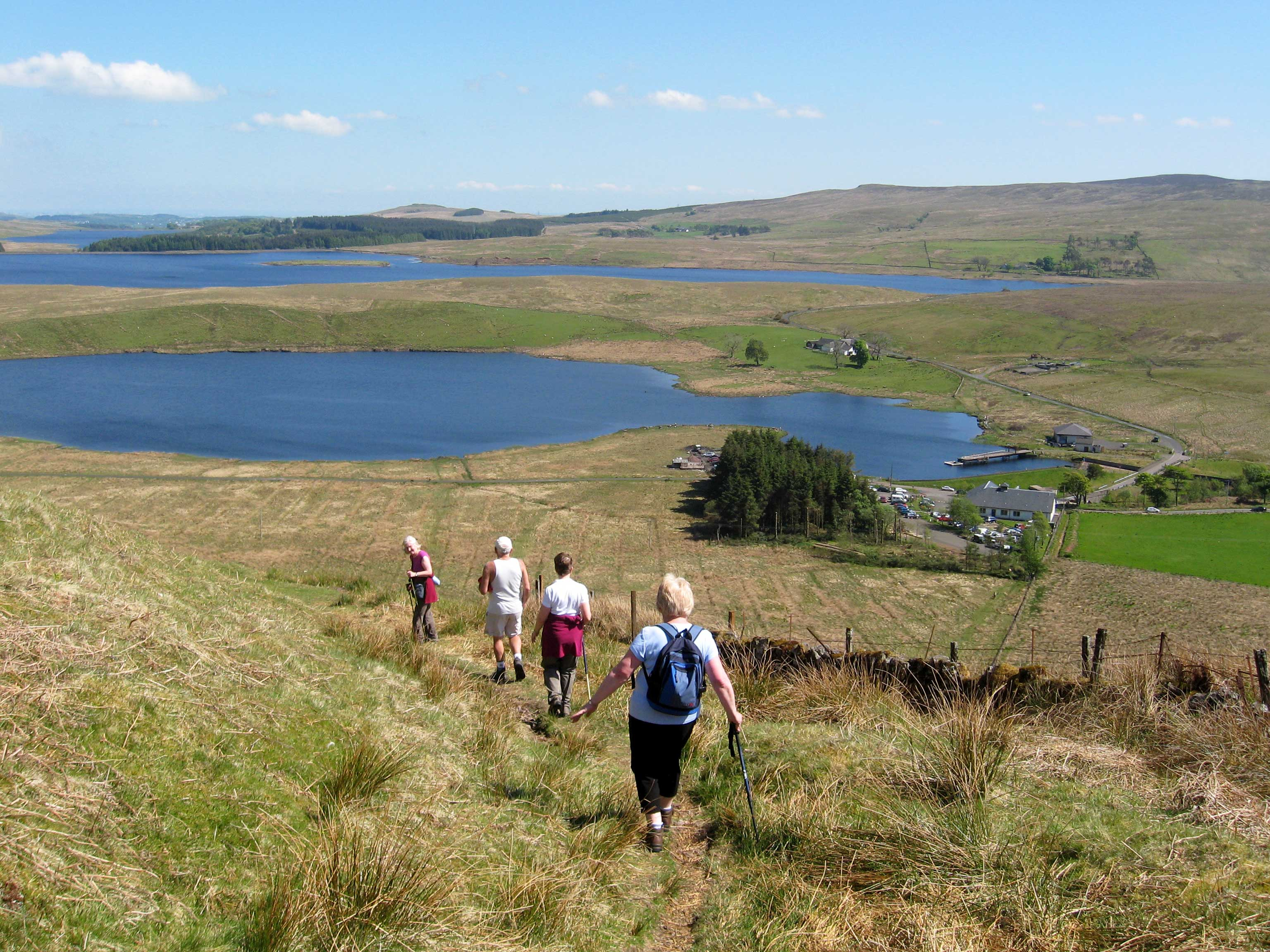
View from Hillside Hill down to compensation reservoir and Cornalees, with Loch Thom itself further back.

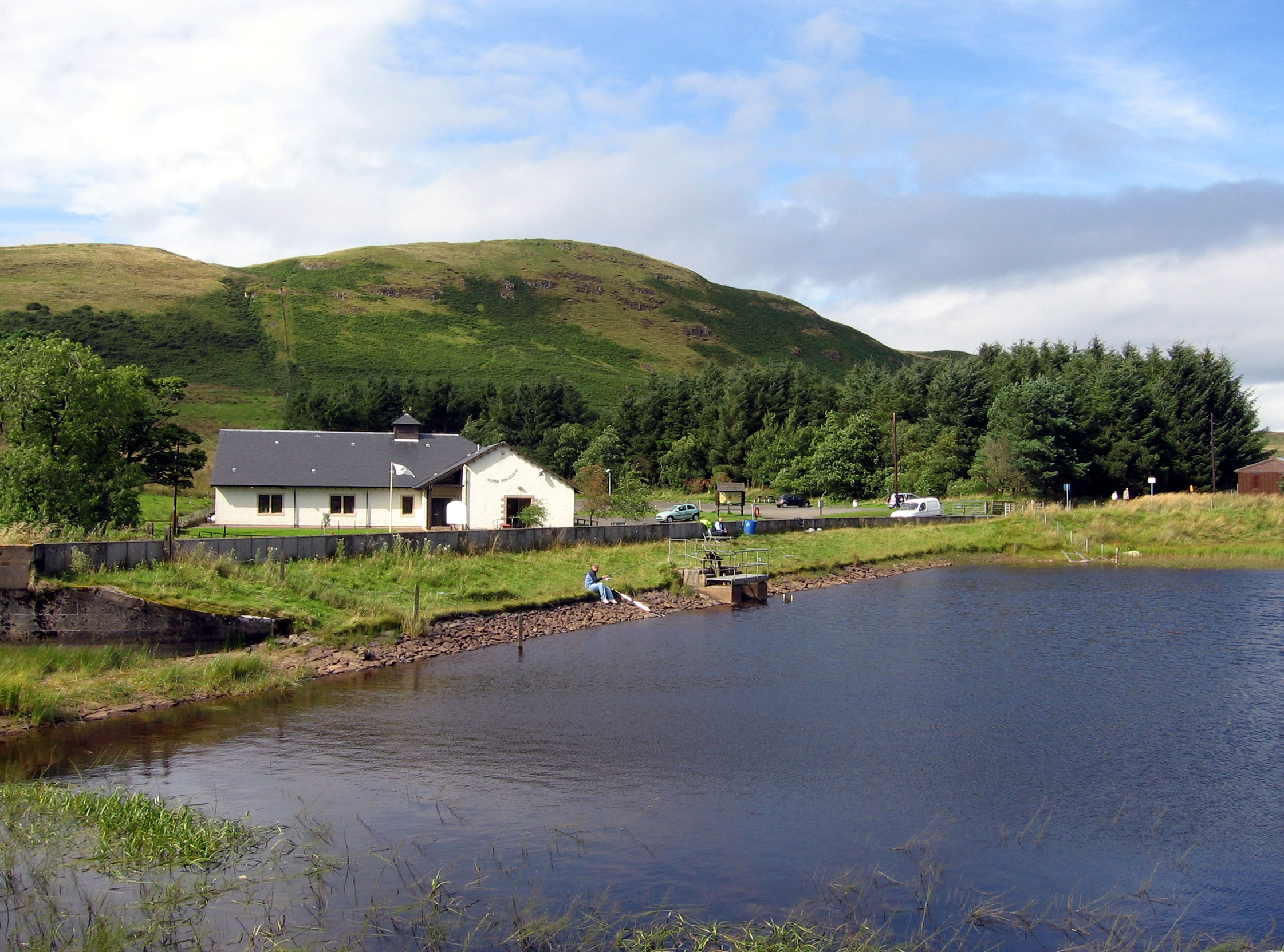
Compensation reservoir and Cut Centre at Cornalees, in front of Hillside Hill.

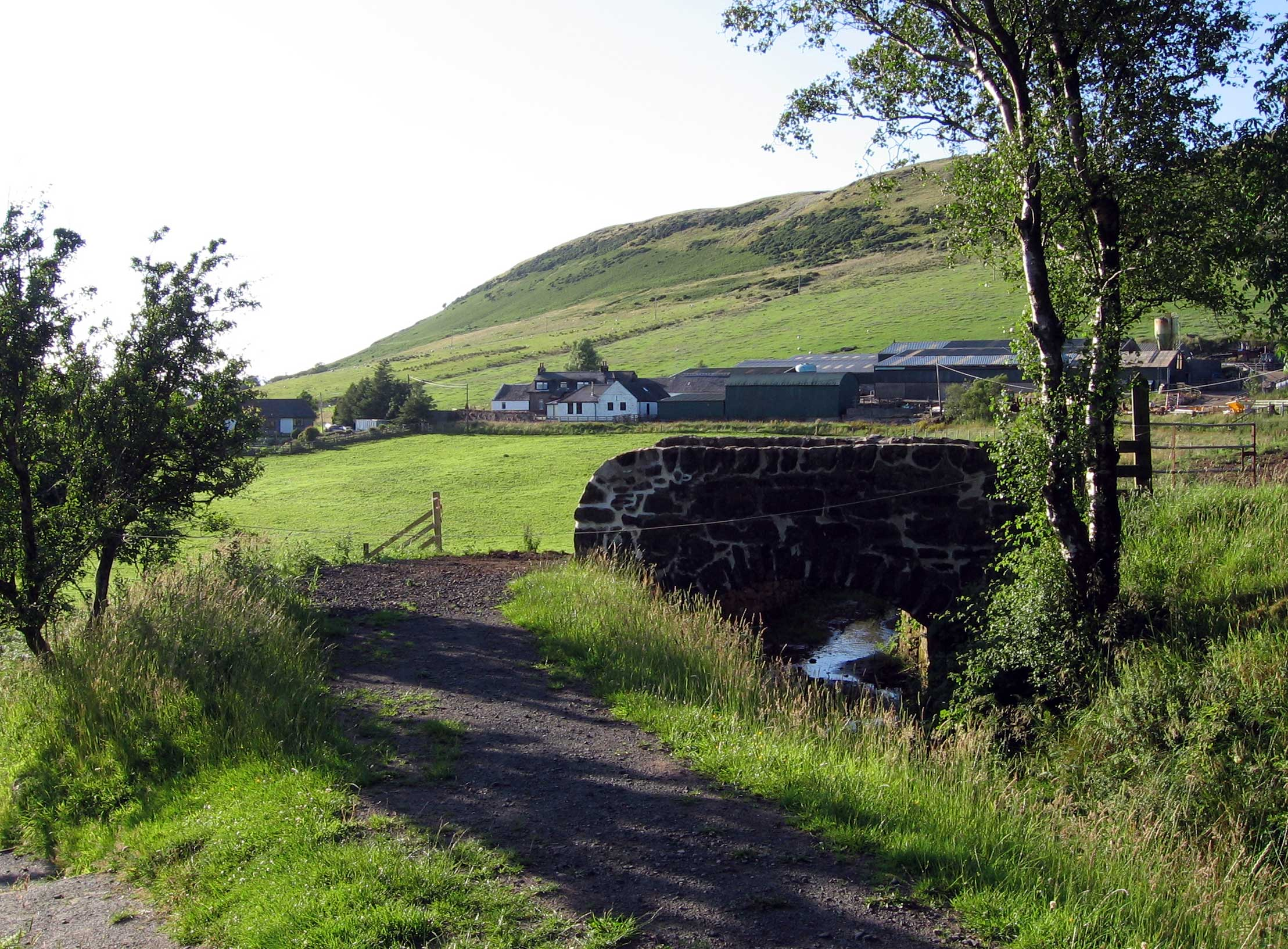
Near the start of The Cut, grid reference NS242719, looking northwest towards Shielhill Farm and Dunrod Hill.

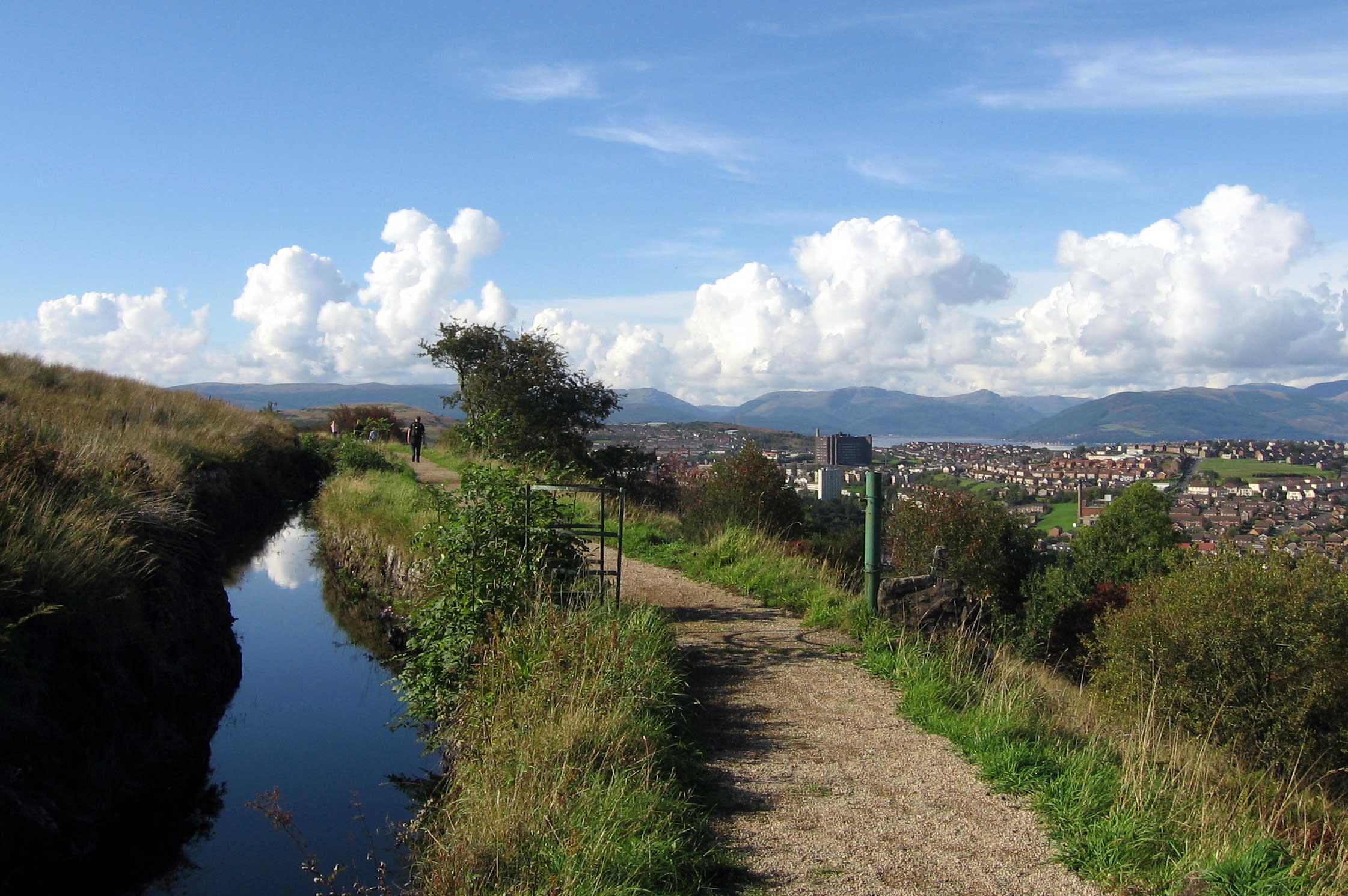
Looking back along The Cut from Overton.

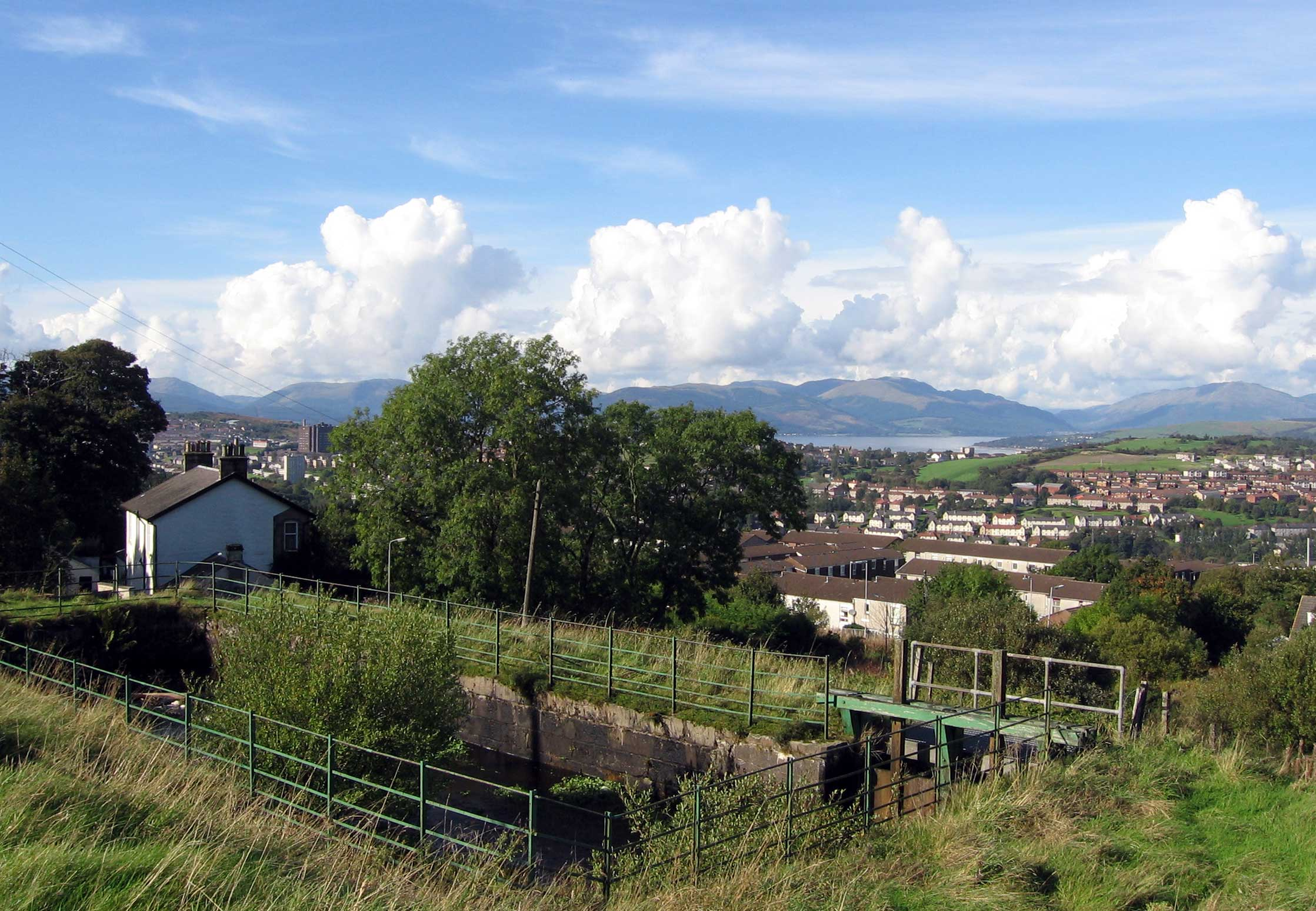
Shaws Water Works compensation reservoir and water engineer's house at Overton.

Loch Thom is a reservoir which since 1827 has provided a water supply to the town of Greenock in Inverclyde, Scotland. It is named after the civil engineer Robert Thom who designed the scheme which created the reservoir and delivered water via a long aqueduct known as The Cut. Today, as well as providing a water supply, the loch is used for sport fishing and forms part of the Clyde Muirshiel Regional Park with several attractive walks and the Greenock Cut Visitor centre at Cornalees Bridge providing a small museum and base for Inverclyde Council Ranger service who assist visitors and provide outdoor learning opportunities for local schools.

The loch is about 2.4 km from north to south, curving to the east in a rough C-shape, and is at an elevation of about 195 m above sea level. From the northern arm an outlet feeds southwest a short distance to a compensation reservoir at the centre of the "C", which then connects at Cornalees Bridge to the start of The Cut.

== History ==
In the late 18th century Greenock was a rapidly expanding seaport with industries developing as the Industrial Revolution gathered pace. Its location on the north slopes of hills sweeping down to the south bank of the Firth of Clyde meant that several fast flowing streams provided supplies, and a number of wells provided clean water for domestic use. This was supplemented in 1773 by a piped water system designed by James Watt supplying some areas, but there was increasing demand for water powered mills.

On the far side of the hills to the south of the town a natural dip held a freshwater lake known as Shaws Water at a level high above the town. The civil engineer Robert Thom from Rothesay prepared a scheme to turn this into a reservoir and create the aqueduct which became known as The Cut.

The Shaws Water Joint Stock Company named by Sir Michael Shaw Stewart, 5th Baronet and friends, which was incorporated on 10 June 1825 with capital of £30,000. The scheme was officially opened on 16 April 1827. On that day a grain mill, paper mill, power loom manufactory and a sugar refinery made use of the power from the water running north down to the sea for a vertical height of around 170 m, at a rate of about 21,000 cubic feet (590 m^{3}) of water per day. In 1845 The Kelly Cut was constructed to bring more water to Loch Thom from the south. Numerous other mills were added in Greenock to make use of the supply, including what became The Merino Mills weaving woollen cloth, and a mill grinding clay for a local pottery works. A drought caused the reservoir to run dry in 1852 stopping work at the factories that relied on it.

The water supply proved inadequate for growing domestic demand, and in 1872 another reservoir was created immediately to the east of Loch Thom at Gryffe Reservoir. Together with thirteen smaller reservoirs nearby they provide almost 650,000,000 cubic feet (18,000,000 m^{3}) of water supply in total

== Greenock Cut Centre ==
Loch Thom forms part of Clyde Muirshiel Regional Park, a public organisation aimed at providing countryside access and education. Several nature trails are provided, and the Greenock Cut Centre adjacent to Cornalees Bridge (which was the centre's former name) provides educational facilities at a ranger base, along with car parking, refreshments and public toilets. Location: grid reference NS247721.

== The Cut ==
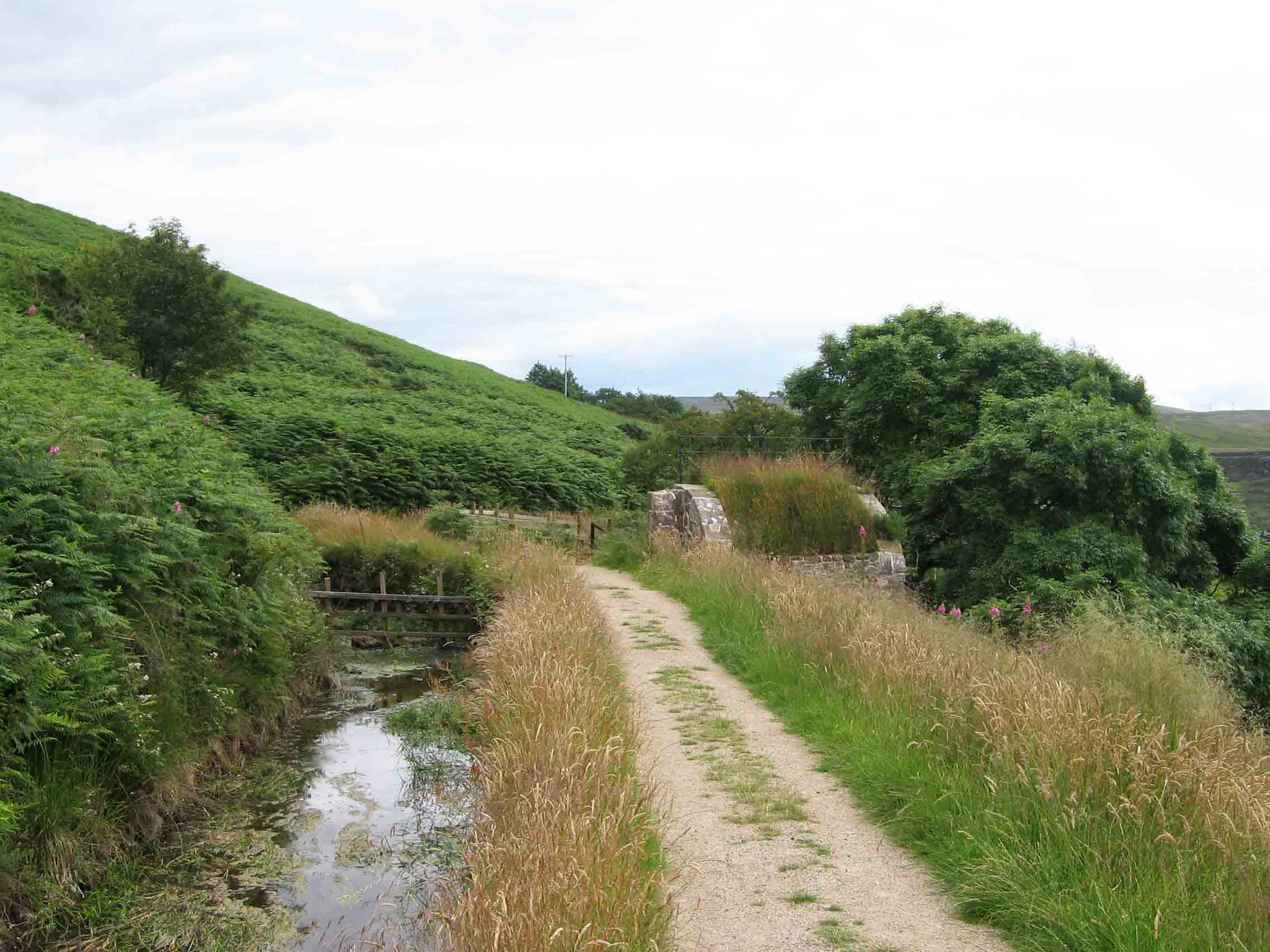
The Greenock Cut, with one of the small stone buildings over a sluice gate.

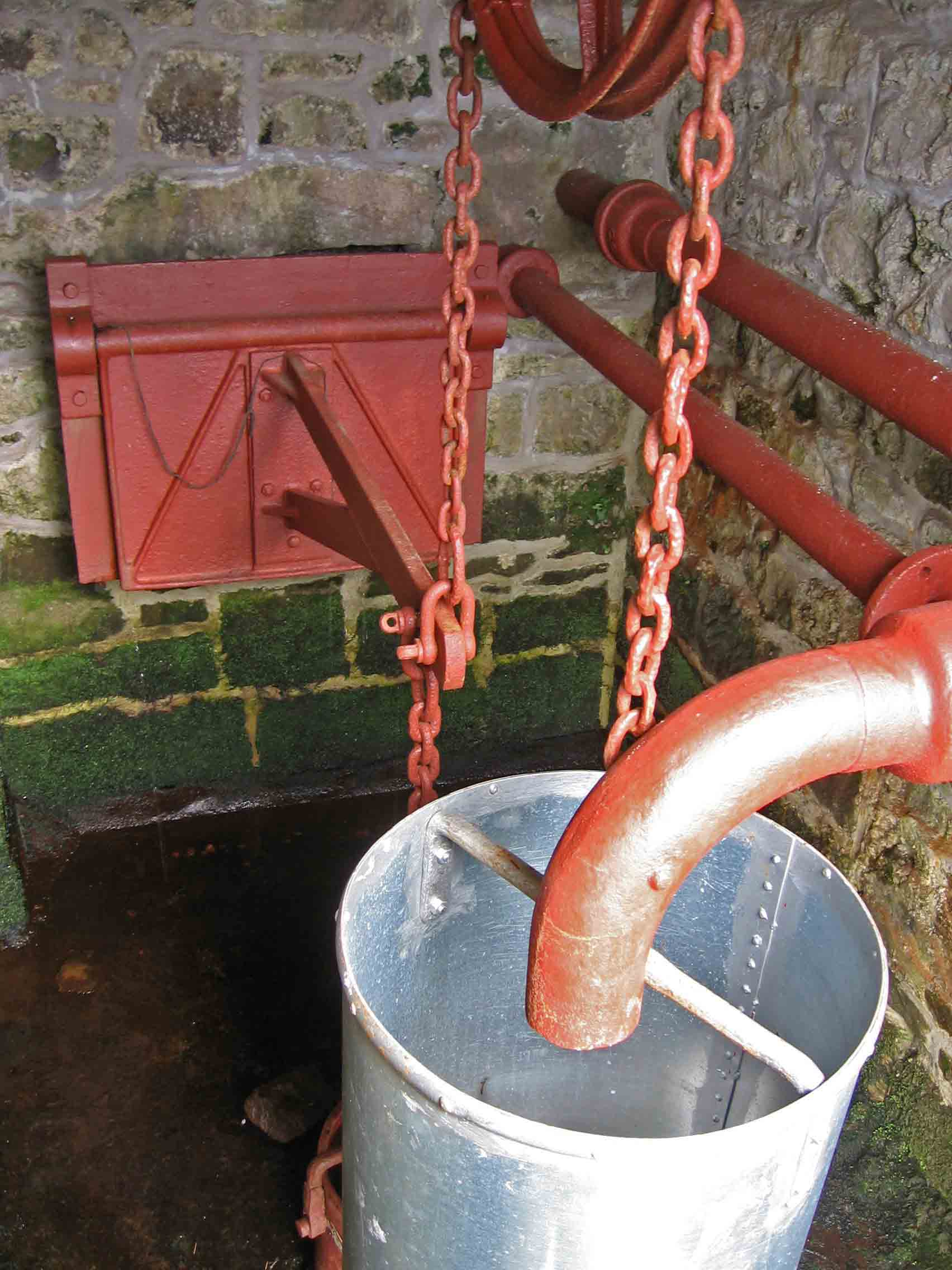
Automatic sluice gate mechanism.

From Cornalees Bridge The Cut runs west then turns northward following along the contour of Dunrod Hill which it follows round until running eastwards directly above the town of Greenock at Overton, having come a distance of 9 km (5.6 mi). On the way it collects some of the water from streams that cross its path, and a series of sluice gates incorporated an ingenious automatic way of releasing surplus water. As shown in the picture of a restored mechanism, when the aqueduct is over full, water flows down the pipe in the foreground and fills the bucket, which then pulls the chain down over the pulley wheel and lifts the counterweight and the lever opening the sluice gate. Small holes in the bucket allow the water to drain slowly out, so when the inflow stops the counterweight eventually pulls the sluice gate lever down and lifts the empty bucket.

The cut provided a water flow to a series of falls running through water wheels powering various industrial processes, including a papermill, woollen and cotton mills, ropeworks, several sugar refineries, an iron foundry and shipbuilding works including production of steam engines and boilers.

From its opening, the nearly level footpath formed on the embankment to the downhill side of the aqueduct proved a great attraction, and "walking the Cut" continues to be popular.

== Literature ==
The poet W. S. Graham's later work powerfully evokes his childhood in and around Greenock. In "Loch Thom", included in Implements in their Places, published in 1977, the loch becomes the focus of his memories:

The curlew's cry travelling still

Kills me fairly. In front of me
The grouse flurry and settle. GOBACK

GOBACK GOBACK FAREWELL LOCH THOM.

== See also ==
- List of reservoirs and dams in the United Kingdom
