= Robert Thom (engineer) =

Scottish civil engineer

- Born: 1774; Tarbolton, South Ayrshire, Scotland
- Died: 1847 (Age: 72–73)
- Occupation: civil engineer
- Known for: First water purification plant in Paisley, Scotland using slow sand filtration to remove bacteria in water.

Robert Thom (1774 Tarbolton, South Ayrshire, Scotland - 1847) was a Scottish civil engineer who worked upon major hydraulic projects on the Isle of Bute and Inverclyde. On Bute, he created aqueducts to increase the flow of water which powered the cotton mills there, so that their capacity was increased. This economic success resulted in him becoming the laird of Ascog. He then created a larger system to supply water power to Greenock. The reservoir is named after him — Loch Thom — and the supply aqueduct is known as the Greenock Cut. In the early 1800s, he designed the first water purification plant in Scotland.

== See also ==
- Slow sand filter
