= Regional parks of Scotland =

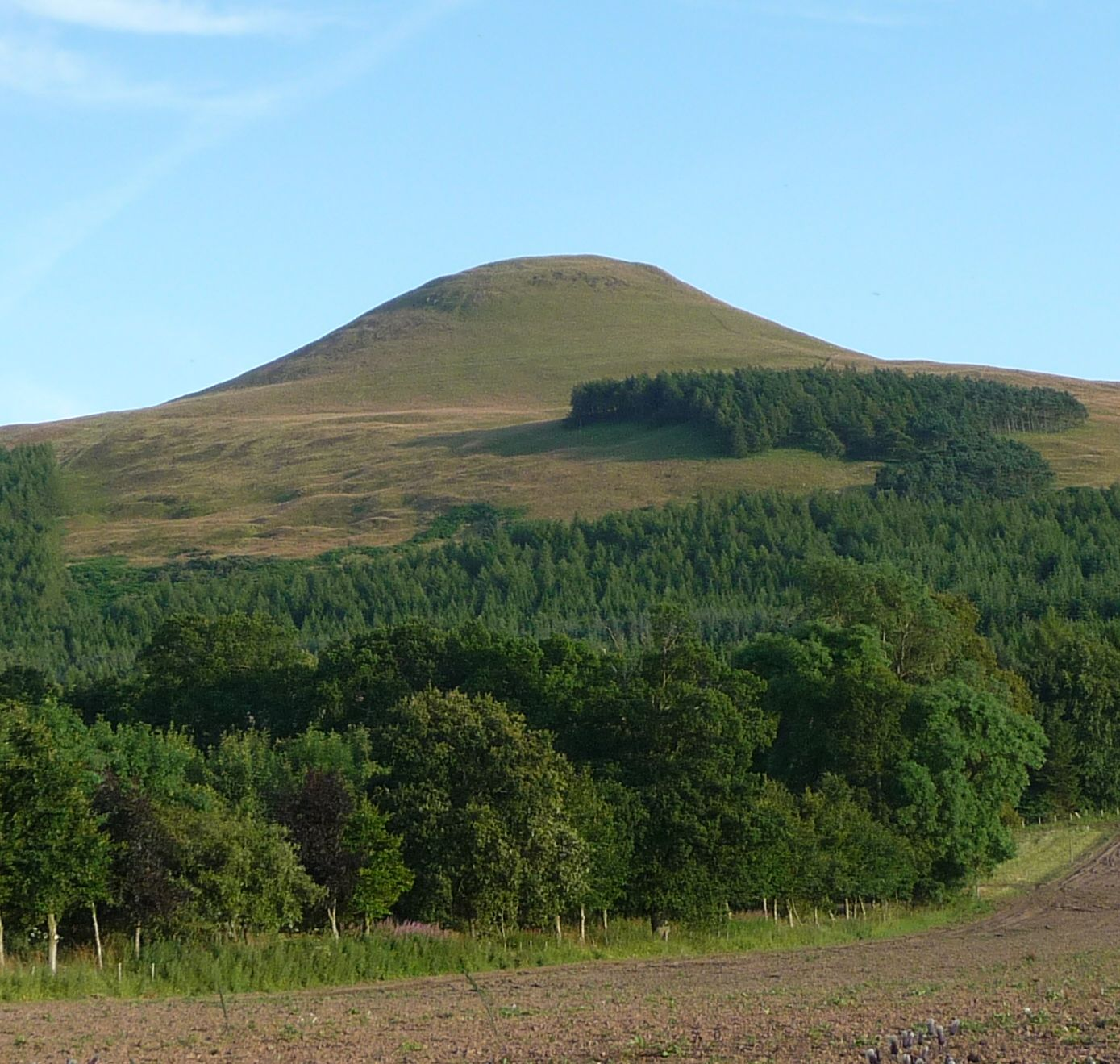
Falkland Hill in the Lomond Hills Regional Park

The regional parks of Scotland are areas of attractive countryside that are of importance for recreation due to their proximity to population centres. The parks are defined to co-ordinate the management of these areas by providing visitor facilities such as car parks, footpaths, ranger services and visitor centres.

Regional parks are defined and managed by local authorities, supported by NatureScot, using powers granted in the Countryside (Scotland) Act 1967 and the Countryside (Scotland) Act 1981. There are currently three regional parks, all located in the country's densely populated central belt: Clyde Muirshiel, the Pentland Hills and the Lomond Hills. Combined, these three cover 440 square kilometres (168 sq mi), or about 0.5% of Scotland's total land area.

As of 2018 it was estimated that the three regional parks together received at least 2 million visits each year.

== History ==
The three regional parks of Scotland

The origins of the regional parks can be traced back to the work of the former Countryside Commission for Scotland. In a 1974 report the commission outlined the main aims of the regional park designation:

[Regional parks] could be some thousands of hectares in area, with recreation as the dominant use in parts only. The areas within a regional park which would be intensively used for recreation would be linked together by footpaths, with a view to reducing pressure on areas of sensitive farming and forestry interests. Regional parks can be designated by the regional authorities in consultation with the CCS and subject to the approval of central government, and generally they will be managed by the regional authorities with funding support from central government.

— A Park System for Scotland, 1974

By 1990 there were four regional parks in existence, however the number dropped to the current three in 2002, when the new Loch Lomond and The Trossachs National Park replaced the regional park covering Loch Lomond. Since then there have been proposals for the creation of additional regional parks, generally in other popular hill areas close to large cities in central Scotland. In 2012, Scottish Natural Heritage suggested that a new regional park could be created in the Campsie Fells. This suggestion was supported by the Scottish Campaign for National Parks in 2018, along with proposals for a new regional park covering the Ochil Hills. In 2022 Avich and Kilchrenan community council proposed that the area surrounding Loch Awe should be designated a regional park by Argyll and Bute Council.

== Management ==
Each regional park is managed by a joint committee consisting of members appointed by the constituent local authorities, alongside representatives of local landowners and other interested organisations. Funding for park activities is provided by the constituent local authorities, but since 2005/6 there has been no direct funding of the parks from the Scottish Government. The lack of central funding has led to a reduction in staff numbers at all three parks.

Within each regional park certain areas are designated as country parks, "core areas" with more concentrated provision for outdoor recreation:

- Clyde Muirshiel: Castle Semple Loch and Muirshiel Country Parks
- Lomond Hills: Lochore Meadows Country Park
- Pentland Hills: Hillend and Bonaly Country Parks

== List of regional parks ==
Name	Date formed	Area	Local authorities
Clyde Muirshiel Regional Park	1990	280 km^{2} (108 sq mi)	Renfrewshire, Inverclyde and North Ayrshire
Lomond Hills Regional Park	1986	65 km^{2} (25 sq mi)	Fife
Pentland Hills Regional Park	1986	91 km^{2} (35 sq mi)	City of Edinburgh, Midlothian and West Lothian
