= Overton, Greenock =

Coordinates: 55.93701°N 4.77879°W

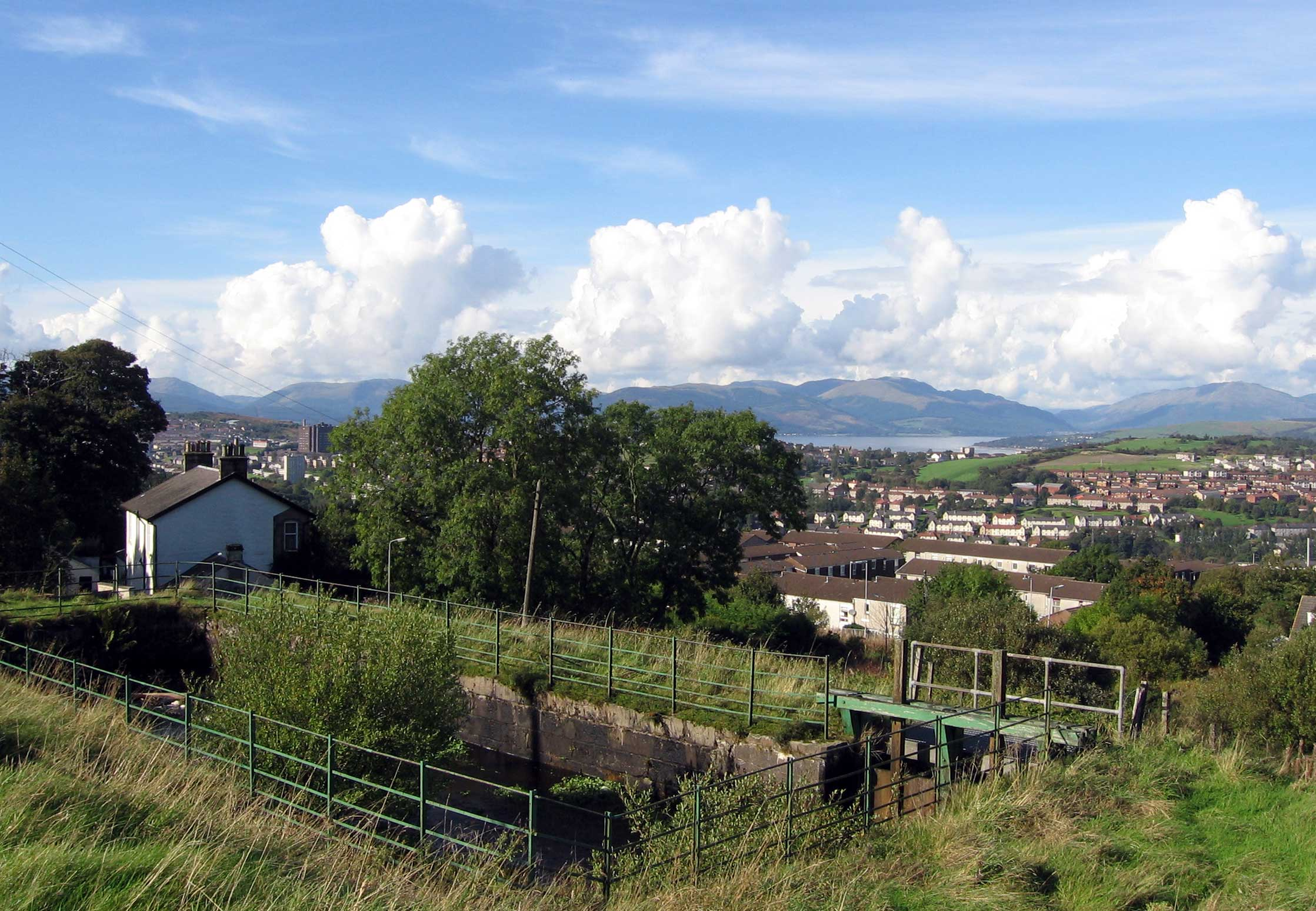
Shaws Water Works compensation reservoir and water engineer's house overlooking the houses of Overton.

Overton is an area in the suburbs of Greenock, Inverclyde. Overton offers excellent views across the River Clyde and suburban Greenock.

The area is the closest in Greenock to "The Cut", which was completed in 1827, bringing a water supply 9 km (5.6 mi) from Loch Thom to Overton. The Shaws Water Works provided power to mills down the hill slope from Overton as well as the water supply for the town of Greenock. The nearly horizontal pathway beside the cut soon became a popular walk, offering views of the town and surrounding scenery.

An alternative track goes over the hill from Overton to Loch Thom and is more challenging.
