= 1560 =

1560 in various calendars
- Gregorian calendar: 1560; MDLX
- Ab urbe condita: 2313
- Armenian calendar: 1009; ԹՎ ՌԹ
- Assyrian calendar: 6310
- Balinese saka calendar: 1481–1482
- Bengali calendar: 966–967
- Berber calendar: 2510
- English Regnal year: 2 Eliz. 1 – 3 Eliz. 1
- Buddhist calendar: 2104
- Burmese calendar: 922
- Byzantine calendar: 7068–7069
- Chinese calendar: 己未年 (Earth Goat); 4257 or 4050 — to — 庚申年 (Metal Monkey); 4258 or 4051
- Coptic calendar: 1276–1277
- Discordian calendar: 2726
- Ethiopian calendar: 1552–1553
- Hebrew calendar: 5320–5321
- Hindu calendars
- Vikram Samvat: 1616–1617
- Shaka Samvat: 1481–1482
- Kali Yuga: 4660–4661
- Holocene calendar: 11560
- Igbo calendar: 560–561
- Iranian calendar: 938–939
- Islamic calendar: 967–968
- Japanese calendar: Eiroku 3 (永禄３年)
- Javanese calendar: 1479–1480
- Julian calendar: 1560; MDLX
- Korean calendar: 3893
- Minguo calendar: 352 before ROC 民前352年
- Nanakshahi calendar: 92
- Thai solar calendar: 2102–2103
- Tibetan calendar: ས་མོ་ལུག་ལོ་ (female Earth-Sheep); 1686 or 1305 or 533 — to — ལྕགས་ཕོ་སྤྲེ་ལོ་ (male Iron-Monkey); 1687 or 1306 or 534

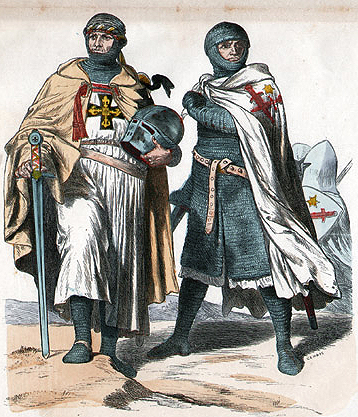
August 2: The Livonian Brothers of the Sword are defeated.

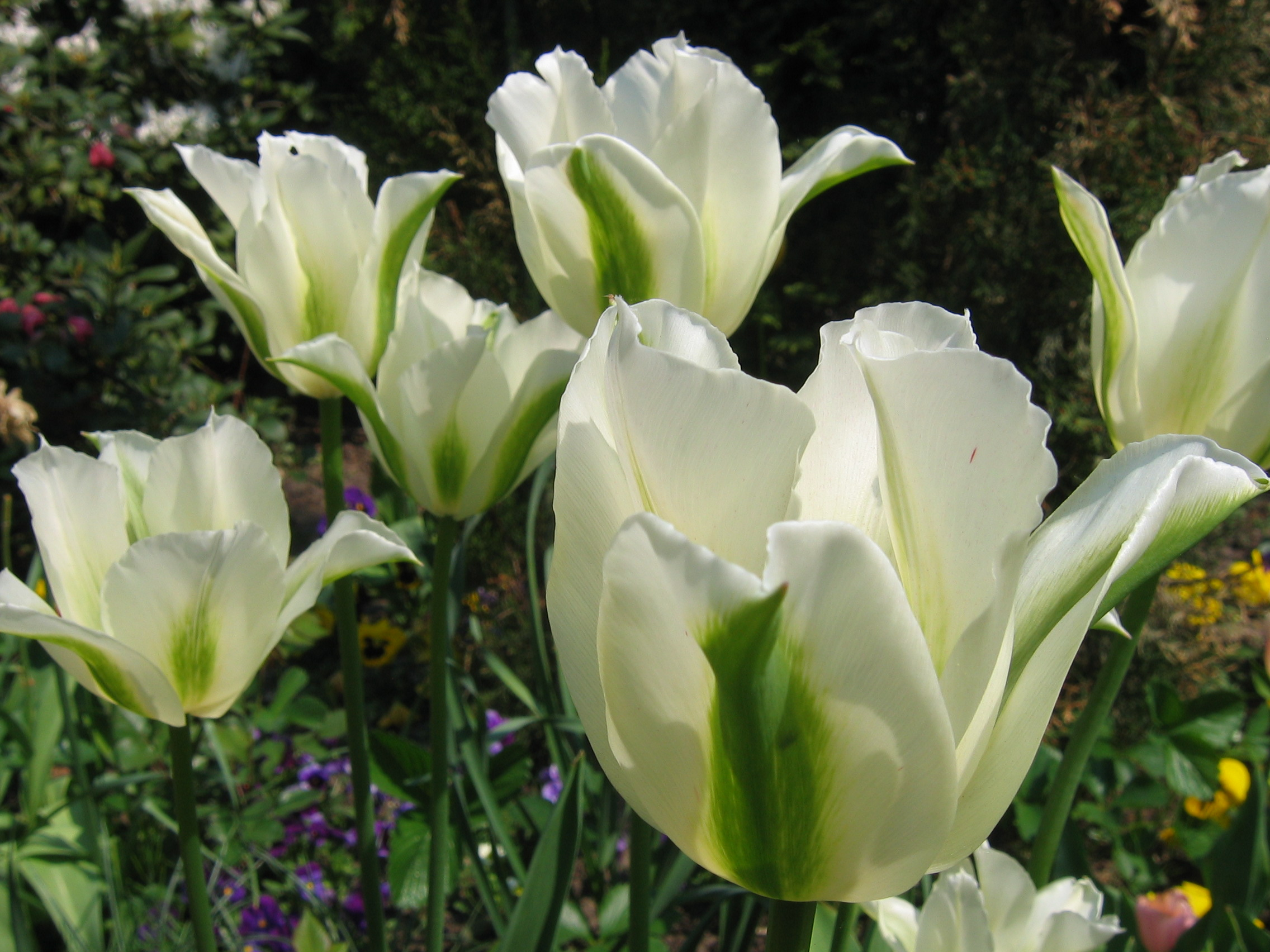
Tulips arrive in the Netherlands.

Year 1560 (MDLX) was a leap year starting on Monday of the Julian calendar.

== Events ==
=== January–March ===
- January 7 – In the Kingdom of Scotland, French troops commanded by Henri Cleutin and Captain Corbeyran de Cardaillac Sarlabous sail across the Firth of Forth from Leith, which they are occupying, and fight with the Lords of the Congregation at Pettycur Bay near Kinghorn.
- February 27 – Treaty of Berwick: Terms are agreed upon with the Lords of the Congregation in Scotland, for forces of the Kingdom of England to enter Scotland, to expel French troops defending the Regency of Mary of Guise.
- March 7 – A Spanish-led expedition, commanded by Juan de la Cerda, 4th Duke of Medinaceli, overruns the Tunisian island of Djerba.
- March 17 – Leaders of the Amboise conspiracy, including Godefroy de Barry, seigneur de La Renaudie, make an unsuccessful attempt to storm the château of Amboise, where the young French king and queen are residing. La Renaudie is subsequently caught and executed, along with over 1,000 of his followers.
- March – Bairam Khan, the Vakil or prime minister of India's Mughal Empire, is forced to retire by the Emperor Akbar.

=== April–June ===
- April 15 – Denmark–Norway buys the Estonian island of Ösel, from its last prince-bishop.
- May 11 – In the Battle of Djerba, the Ottoman fleet, commanded by Piali Pasha, overwhelms a large joint European (mainly Spanish) fleet, sinking about half its ships.
- June 12 (19th day of 5th month of Eiroku 3) – In Japan, Oda Nobunaga defeats Imagawa Yoshimoto in the Battle of Okehazama.

=== July–September ===
- July 6 – The Treaty of Edinburgh is signed between England, France and Scotland, ending the Siege of Leith. The French withdraw from Scotland, largely ending the Auld Alliance between the two countries, and also ending the wars between England and its northern neighbour.
- August 2 – Livonian War – Battle of Ergeme: Russians defeat the Livonian Brothers of the Sword, precipitating the dissolution of the order.
- August 17 – The Scottish Reformation Parliament adopts a Protestant confession of faith and rejects papal authority, beginning the Scottish Reformation, and disestablishing Roman Catholicism in Scotland.
- August 21 – A total eclipse of the sun is observable in Europe, which inspires Tycho Brahe's interest in astronomy.
- September 18 – After Robert Sempill, 3rd Lord Sempill, a Scottish Catholic, continues to resist the Scottish Reformation, the Duke of Châtellerault and the Earl of Arran commence a siege of Castle Semple at Lochwinnoch. They begin firing artillery at the castle on September 23 and destroys the gatehouse.
- September 29 – Eric XIV becomes King of Sweden, upon the death of his father, Gustav Vasa.

=== October–December ===
- October 4 – Queen Elizabeth of England notifies the official treasurers and Lords Mayor throughout the kingdom that the existing coins will be replaced and that those in circulation are to be devalued, to be stricken with a special mark to indicate lesser worth. Treasurers are all instructed to send the coins withdrawn from circulation to be sent to the Royal Mint to be melted down for the new coins.
- October 19 – The siege of Castle Semple ends after 31 days when the defenders wave the white flag of surrender.
- October 29 – Queen Elizabeth directs the minting of the first machine produced coins in the Kingdom to completely replace hammered coinage, produced manually.
- November 8 – Eloy Mestrelle is given authority to commence the production of the new English coinage on machines he has brought over from France for the purpose of mass production.
- December 5 – Charles IX succeeds his brother Francis as King of France, after Francis dies of a severe ear infection at the age of 16. Francis's mother (Mary's mother-in-law), Catherine de' Medici, becomes regent of France.

=== Date unknown ===
- The complete Geneva Bible is published.
- The first scientific society, the Academia Secretorum Naturae, is founded in Naples by Giambattista della Porta.
- Solihull School is founded in the West Midlands of England.
- The oldest surviving violin (dated inside), known as the Charles IX, is made in Cremona, in northern Italy.
- The Mongols invade and occupy Qinghai.
- The great age of piracy in the Caribbean starts around this time.

== Births ==
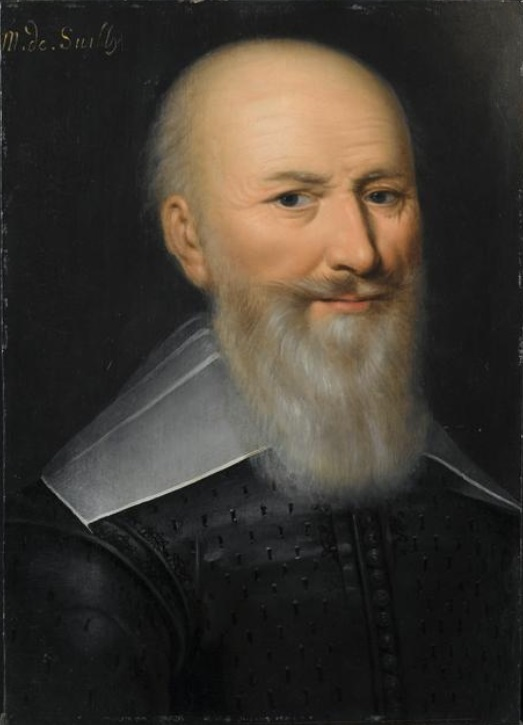
Maximilien de Béthune, Duke of Sully

- January 17 – Gaspard Bauhin, Swiss botanist (d. 1624)
- January 29 – Scipione Dentice, Neapolitan keyboard composer (d. 1633)
- March 13 – William Louis, Count of Nassau-Dillenburg, Dutch count (d. 1620)
- March 29 – Erekle I, Prince of Mukhrani, Georgian noble (d. 1605)
- April 19 – Count Jobst of Limburg (d. 1621)
- May 6 – Guido Pepoli, Italian Catholic cardinal (d. 1599)
- June 25 – Wilhelm Fabry, German surgeon (d. 1634)
- June 28 – Giovanni Paolo Lascaris, Italian Grand Master of the Knights Hospitaller (d. 1657)
- July 1 – Charles III de Croÿ, Belgian noble (d. 1612)
- July 7 – Margaret Clifford, Countess of Cumberland, English noblewoman and maid of honor to Elizabeth I (d. 1616)
- August 6 – Antoine Arnauld, French lawyer (d. 1619)
- August 7 – Elizabeth Báthory, Hungarian noblewoman and purported serial killer (d. 1614)
- August 10 – Hieronymus Praetorius, German composer (d. 1629)
- August 19 – James Crichton, Scottish polymath (d. 1582)
- August 25 – Pak Chin, Korean naval commander (d. 1597)
- September 4 – Charles I, Count Palatine of Zweibrücken-Birkenfeld (d. 1600)
- September 19 – Thomas Cavendish, English naval explorer, leader of the third expedition to circumnavigate the globe (d. 1592)
- October 10 – Jacobus Arminius, Dutch theologian (d. 1609)
- October 17 – Ernest Frederick, Margrave of Baden-Durlach (d. 1604)
- October 29 – Christian I, Elector of Saxony (d. 1591)
- November 3 – Annibale Carracci, Italian painter (d. 1609)
- November 22 – Charles, Margrave of Burgau, German nobleman (d. 1618)
- November 28 – Baltasar Marradas, Count of Spain (d. 1638)
- December 3 – Jan Gruter, Dutch critic and scholar (d. 1627)
- December 13 – Maximilien de Béthune, Duke of Sully, 2nd Prime Minister of France (d. 1641)
- December 28 – Samuel Sandys, English politician (d. 1623)
- December 29 – Wolfgang Ernst I of Isenburg-Büdingen-Birstein, German count (d. 1633)
- date unknown
  - Felice Anerio, Italian composer (d. 1614)
  - Marco Antonio de Dominis, Dalmatian archbishop and apostate (d. 1624)
  - Amalia von Hatzfeld, Swedish countess governor (d. 1628)
  - Lieven de Key, Dutch architect (d. 1627)
  - Ishida Mitsunari, Japanese samurai (d. 1600)
  - Hugh Myddelton, Welsh businessman (d. 1631)
  - Anton Praetorius, German pastor (d. 1613)
- probable
  - Jan Karol Chodkiewicz, Polish military commander (d. 1621)
  - Adam Haslmayr, Tyrolean commentator on Rosicrucian manifestos (d. 1630)
  - Ketevan the Martyr, Georgian queen and saint (d. 1624)

== Deaths ==
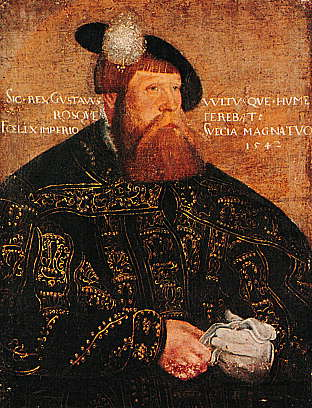
King Gustavus I of Sweden

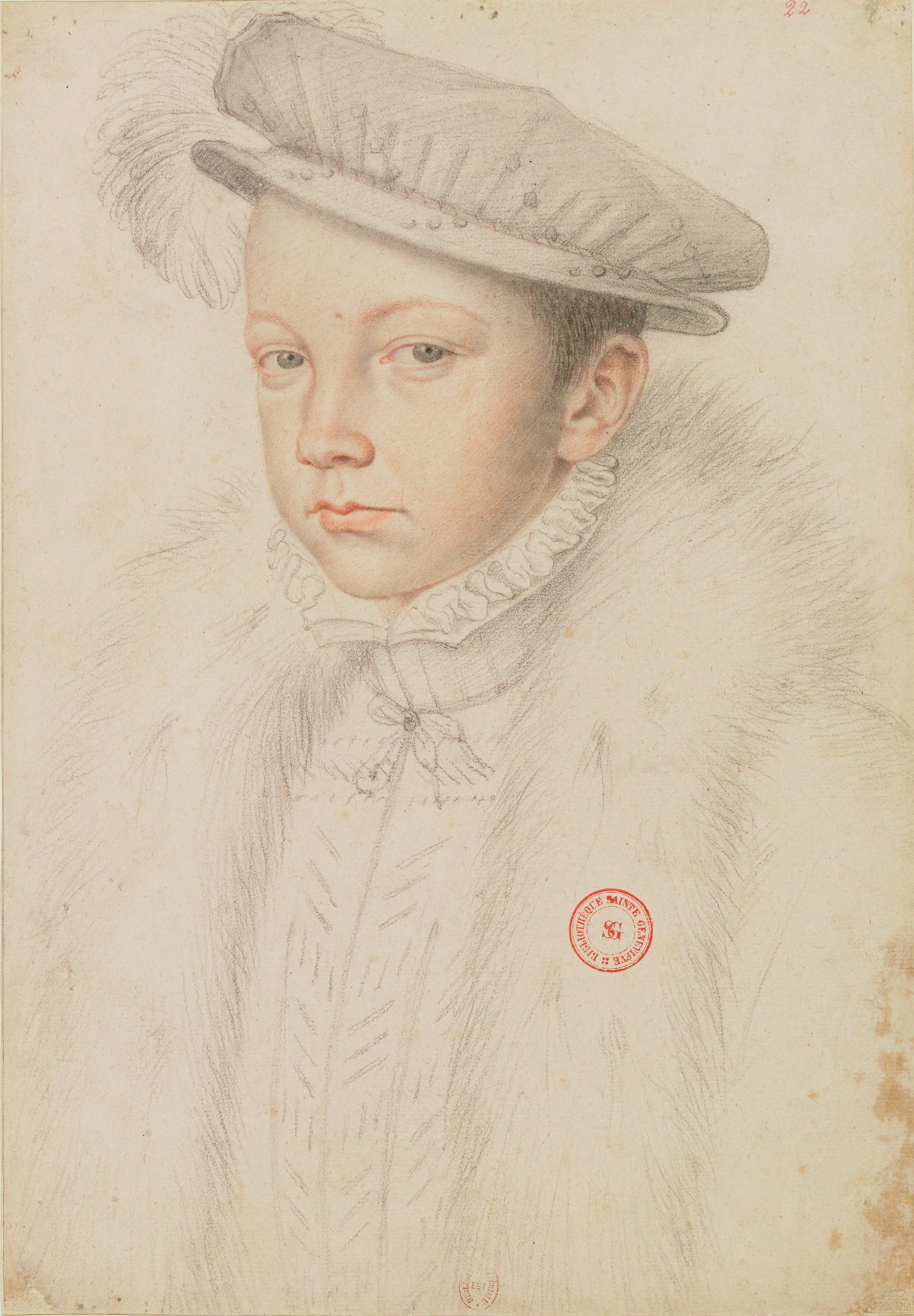
King Francis II of France

- January 1 – Joachim du Bellay, French poet (b. 1522)
- January 8 – Jan Łaski, Polish Protestant evangelical reformer (b. 1499)
- January 22 – Wang Zhi, Chinese pirate
- February 7 – Bartolommeo Bandinelli, Florentine sculptor (b. 1493)
- February 14 – Philip I, Duke of Pomerania-Wolgast (b. 1515)
- February 16 – Jean du Bellay, French cardinal and diplomat (b. 1493)
- March 5 – Pedro Pacheco de Villena, Spanish Catholic cardinal (b. 1488)
- April 19 – Philip Melanchthon, German humanist and reformer (b. 1497)
- June 11 – Mary of Guise, queen of James V of Scotland and regent (b. 1515)
- June 12
  - Imagawa Yoshimoto, Japanese daimyō (b. 1519)
  - Ii Naomori, Japanese warrior (b. 1506)
- August 4 – Maeda Toshimasa, Japanese samurai
- August 7 – Anastasia Romanovna, Tsarina of Russia, married to Russian Tsar Ivan the Terrible (b. 1530)
- September 8 – Amy Robsart, English noblewoman (b. 1532)
- September 14 – Anton Fugger, German merchant (b. 1493)
- September 29 – King Gustav I of Sweden (b. 1496)
- September 30 – Melchor Cano, Spanish theologian (b. 1525)
- November 7 – Petrus Lotichius Secundus, German Neo-Latin poet (b. 1528)
- November 25 – Andrea Doria, Italian naval commander (b. 1466)
- December 2 – Georg Sabinus, German writer (b. 1508)
- December 5 – King Francis II of France (b. 1544)
- December 7 – Ernest of Bavaria, pledge lord of the County of Glatz (b. 1500)
- Date unknown – Benvenida Abrabanel, philanthropist and businesswoman.
