= List of listed buildings in Lochwinnoch, Renfrewshire =

This is a list of listed buildings in the parish of Lochwinnoch in Renfrewshire, Scotland.

== List ==
| Name | Location | Date Listed | Grid Ref. (Note: Sometimes known as OSGB36, the grid reference (where provided) is based on the British national grid reference system used by the Ordnance Survey. • "Guide to National Grid". Ordnance Survey. • "Get-a-map". Ordnance Survey.) | Geo-coordinates | Notes | LB Number (Note: Historic Environment Scotland assign a unique alphanumeric identifier to each designated site in Scotland, for listed buildings this always begins with "LB", for example "LB12345".) | Image |
|---|---|---|---|---|---|---|---|
| Lochwinnoch Village 1 Harvey Square And 21-27 Church Street (Odd Numbers Only) | | | | 55°47′40″N 4°37′42″W | Category B | 12606 | Upload Photo |
| Nervelstone House Steading And Walled Garden | | | | 55°46′24″N 4°39′51″W | Category B | 12626 | Upload Photo |
| Castle Semple Long Barn (Former Stable Block) | | | | 55°48′40″N 4°35′23″W | Category B | 12633 | Upload Photo |
| Glenlora House, Gate Piers & Bridge | | | | 55°47′36″N 4°39′56″W | Category B | 12642 | Upload Photo |
| Glenlora Stable Block | | | | 55°47′40″N 4°39′49″W | Category C(S) | 12643 | Upload Photo |
| Loch Bridge Over Loch Water | | | | 55°47′22″N 4°37′21″W | Category B | 12646 | Upload another image |
| Lochwinnoch Village 3 Braehead | | | | 55°47′48″N 4°37′51″W | Category C(S) | 12649 | Upload Photo |
| Auchengrange House & Stables (Formerly Wattiston) | | | | 55°46′55″N 4°35′57″W | Category B | 12660 | Upload another image |
| Calderbank House | | | | 55°48′17″N 4°38′01″W | Category C(S) | 12665 | Upload Photo |
| Lochwinnoch, 51 And 53 High Street, Lochwinnoch Community Library, Including Boundary Wall | | | | 55°47′45″N 4°37′40″W | Category C(S) | 51733 | Upload Photo |
| Castle Semple Park, Cascades, Cave And Walled Garden | | | | 55°48′27″N 4°35′34″W | Category B | 44828 | Upload Photo |
| 19 Johnshill | | | | 55°47′58″N 4°37′26″W | Category C(S) | 13832 | Upload Photo |
| Calderbank Mill | | | | 55°48′14″N 4°38′01″W | Category B | 12605 | Upload Photo |
| 5 Johnshill | | | | 55°47′52″N 4°37′29″W | Category B | 12616 | Upload Photo |
| Main St, Calder House & Gatepiers | | | | 55°47′37″N 4°37′54″W | Category C(S) | 12619 | Upload Photo |
| Low Beltrees Farm | | | | 55°47′32″N 4°35′27″W | Category B | 12623 | Upload Photo |
| Lochwinnoch Village, Church Street, K6 Telephone Kiosk | | | | 55°47′39″N 4°37′43″W | Category B | 12632 | Upload another image |
| Castle Semple Warlock Gates | | | | 55°48′35″N 4°36′39″W | Category B | 12636 | Upload Photo |
| East Gavin Farmhouse | | | | 55°48′17″N 4°34′23″W | Category C(S) | 12639 | Upload Photo |
| Lochside House, Office Range To South West Of House | | | | 55°47′28″N 4°36′30″W | Category C(S) | 12648 | Upload Photo |
| Boghead | | | | 55°48′23″N 4°37′40″W | Category C(S) | 12662 | Upload Photo |
| Lochwinnoch Village Harvey Square Novar | | | | 55°47′40″N 4°37′39″W | Category C(S) | 12607 | Upload Photo |
| 27 High Street | | | | 55°47′43″N 4°37′44″W | Category B | 12610 | Upload Photo |
| 2, 4 High Street | | | | 55°47′41″N 4°37′46″W | Category C(S) | 12613 | Upload Photo |
| 18, 20, 22 High Street | | | | 55°47′42″N 4°37′44″W | Category C(S) | 12614 | Upload Photo |
| St Winnock's Church & Church Yard | | | | 55°47′50″N 4°37′27″W | Category B | 12622 | Upload another image See more images |
| Newton Of Beltrees Glenhead, Valley View And Calver's Cottage | | | | 55°47′20″N 4°35′33″W | Category C(S) | 12628 | Upload Photo |
| Howood The Inn | | | | 55°48′40″N 4°33′22″W | Category B | 12644 | Upload Photo |
| Lochside House | | | | 55°47′29″N 4°36′29″W | Category B | 12647 | Upload Photo |
| Lochwinnoch Village Church Street Calder Uf Manse | | | | 55°47′35″N 4°37′35″W | Category B | 12657 | Upload Photo |
| Caul Near To Bridgend Bridge | | | | 55°47′59″N 4°38′10″W | Category B | 13052 | Upload Photo |
| Lochwinnoch Village, Bridgend, Bridge Over River Calder | | | | 55°47′57″N 4°38′09″W | Category B | 12902 | Upload Photo |
| 29 High Street | | | | 55°47′43″N 4°37′43″W | Category B | 12611 | Upload Photo |
| Main St Calderhaugh Mill | | | | 55°47′37″N 4°37′58″W | Category B | 12620 | Upload Photo |
| Main St Calderhaugh House, Stables, Walled Garden And Gatepiers | | | | 55°47′36″N 4°38′00″W | Category B | 12621 | Upload Photo |
| Lochwinnoch Village Church Street Parish Church And Hall | | | | 55°47′38″N 4°37′43″W | Category A | 12654 | Upload Photo |
| Lochwinnoch Village Church Street Ladeside House | | | | 55°47′35″N 4°37′37″W | Category B | 12655 | Upload Photo |
| Church Street Calder Uf Church And Hall, Gatepiers And Churchyard Wall | | | | 55°47′35″N 4°37′36″W | Category B | 12656 | Upload Photo |
| Barr Castle | | | | 55°47′18″N 4°38′17″W | Category B | 12661 | Upload Photo |
| Lochwinnoch, Largs Road, Saint Joseph's (Formerly Garthland) Including Chapel And Dormitory | | | | 55°47′33″N 4°38′33″W | Category C(S) | 50473 | Upload Photo |
| Castle Semple Farmhouse And Walled Garden No 11 Holding | | | | 55°48′44″N 4°35′20″W | Category B | 13835 | Upload Photo |
| Lochwinnoch, Earlshill Farm | | | | 55°47′40″N 4°34′42″W | Category B | 13336 | Upload Photo |
| 79 High Street | | | | 55°47′47″N 4°37′35″W | Category B | 12612 | Upload Photo |
| 42 High Street | | | | 55°47′44″N 4°37′40″W | Category B | 12615 | Upload Photo |
| Newton Of Beltrees Glenshian | | | | 55°47′19″N 4°35′32″W | Category B | 12627 | Upload Photo |
| Castle Semple West Gates And Gatepiers | | | | 55°47′55″N 4°37′08″W | Category B | 12637 | Upload Photo |
| Clovenstone | | | | 55°49′10″N 4°39′44″W | Category C(S) | 12638 | Upload Photo |
| Langslie | | | | 55°46′30″N 4°39′28″W | Category C(S) | 12645 | Upload Photo |
| 4 Church Street | | | | 55°47′41″N 4°37′46″W | Category C(S) | 12653 | Upload Photo |
| Castle Semple Ice House | | | | 55°48′25″N 4°35′44″W | Category B | 12668 | Upload Photo |
| Harvey Square Ardmannoch | | | | 55°47′40″N 4°37′38″W | Category C(S) | 12608 | Upload Photo |
| North Muir Dykes And Gatepiers | | | | 55°48′04″N 4°34′02″W | Category C(S) | 12630 | Upload Photo |
| Castle Semple Railway Bridge | | | | 55°48′06″N 4°36′25″W | Category B | 12635 | Upload another image |
| Garthland Bridge Over Black Cart | | | | 55°48′45″N 4°33′48″W | Category A | 12641 | Upload Photo |
| Lochwinnoch Village Calder Bridge Over River Calder | | | | 55°47′28″N 4°37′33″W | Category B | 12650 | Upload another image |
| Bourtrees Farm | | | | 55°46′31″N 4°36′50″W | Category B | 12663 | Upload Photo |
| Castle Semple Former Mansion House | | | | 55°48′25″N 4°35′26″W | Category B | 12666 | Upload Photo |
| Castle Semple Collegiate Church | | | | 55°48′25″N 4°35′37″W | Category A | 12667 | Upload Photo |
| Lochwinnoch Village Burnfoot House | | | | 55°47′45″N 4°38′15″W | Category B | 13834 | Upload Photo |
| Lochwinnoch Road, Ward Farm | | | | 55°50′21″N 4°38′18″W | Category C(S) | 13482 | Upload Photo |
| Glenhead Farm House | | | | 55°47′15″N 4°35′35″W | Category B | 12901 | Upload Photo |
| 6-10 Church Street | | | | 55°47′41″N 4°37′46″W | Category C(S) | 12903 | Upload Photo |
| Lochwinnoch Village 23, 25 High Street | | | | 55°47′43″N 4°37′44″W | Category B | 12609 | Upload Photo |
| Low Beltrees Farm Beltrees Private Burial Ground | | | | 55°47′33″N 4°35′27″W | Category B | 12624 | Upload Photo |
| Moniabrock | | | | 55°50′04″N 4°37′57″W | Category C(S) | 12625 | Upload Photo |
| Newton Of Beltrees Former School | | | | 55°47′19″N 4°35′34″W | Category C(S) | 12629 | Upload Photo |
| South Fairhills | | | | 55°47′45″N 4°39′21″W | Category C(S) | 12631 | Upload Photo |
| Castle Semple Ornamental Well | | | | 55°48′33″N 4°35′32″W | Category C(S) | 12634 | Upload Photo |
| Lochwinnoch Village 17, 19 Church St (Former Courthouse And Police Station) | | | | 55°47′40″N 4°37′44″W | Category C(S) | 12652 | Upload Photo |
| Lochwinnoch Village East End Manse | | | | 55°47′58″N 4°37′18″W | Category B | 12659 | Upload Photo |
| 46 Main Street, Lochwinnoch | | | | 55°47′39″N 4°37′53″W | Category C(S) | 13833 | Upload Photo |
| 14-16 (Inclusive Nos) Newton Of Barr | | | | 55°47′34″N 4°38′06″W | Category C(S) | 13312 | Upload Photo |
| Johnshill Crookside | | | | 55°48′00″N 4°37′27″W | Category B | 12617 | Upload Photo |
| Lochwinnoch Village 1 Main St/2 Church Street | | | | 55°47′41″N 4°37′47″W | Category B | 12618 | Upload Photo |
| Howwood, Elliston Farm, Including Dutch Barn | | | | 55°48′27″N 4°33′54″W | Category C(S) | 12640 | Upload Photo |
| 22 Calder St | | | | 55°47′44″N 4°37′50″W | Category C(S) | 12651 | Upload Photo |
| East End Knapdale | | | | 55°47′52″N 4°37′21″W | Category B | 12658 | Upload Photo |

== Key ==
The scheme for classifying buildings in Scotland is:

- Category A: "buildings of national or international importance, either architectural or historic; or fine, little-altered examples of some particular period, style or building type."
- Category B: "buildings of regional or more than local importance; or major examples of some particular period, style or building type, which may have been altered."
- Category C: "buildings of local importance; lesser examples of any period, style, or building type, as originally constructed or moderately altered; and simple traditional buildings which group well with other listed buildings."

In March 2016 there were 47,288 listed buildings in Scotland. Of these, 8% were Category A, and 50% were Category B, with the remaining 42% being Category C.
