= Barr, Scotland =

Barr, Scotland may refer to:

- Barr, Ayrshire, a village in Scotland (in the district of Carrick, South Ayrshire)
- Barr Castle, ruin in Renfrewshire, Scotland
- Barr Castle, in Galston, East Ayrshire, Scotland
