= St John's Kirk, Lochwinnoch =

Ruined church in Lochwinnoch, Scotland

St John's Kirk
- St Winnock's Church; Auld Simon
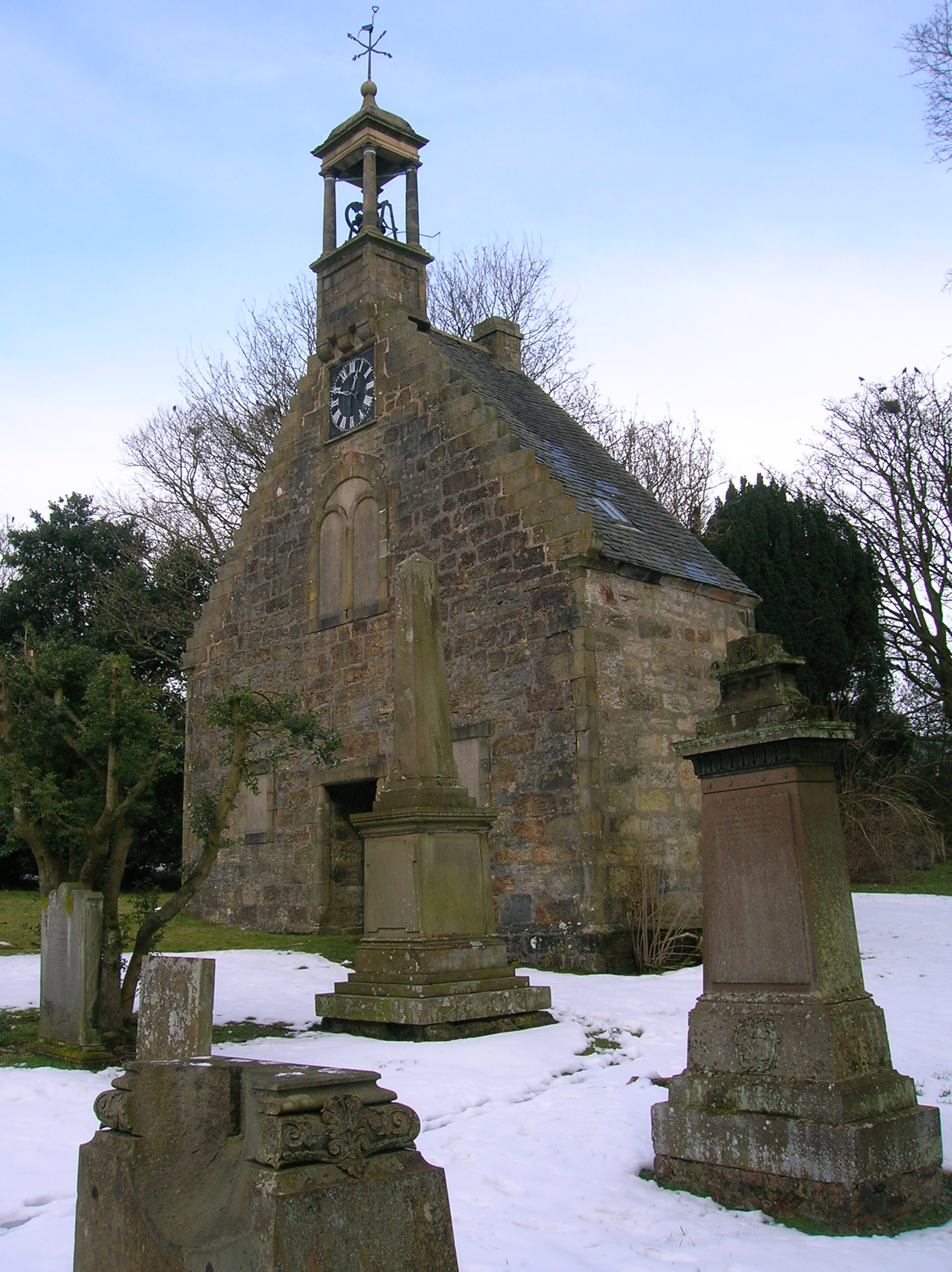
- 2010 view, looking northeast
- St John's Kirk
- 55°47′50″N 4°37′27″W
- Location: Lochwinnoch, Renfrewshire
- Country: Scotland

St John's Kirk, also known as St Winnock's Church and, colloquially, Auld Simon (Old Simon), is a ruined church in Lochwinnoch, Renfrewshire, Scotland. The church's lintel dates to 1729. Only the southwest gable and a single bay of the original structure remain; the rest was likely demolished around the time the new church was built in 1808. The church and surrounding walled cemetery was Category B listed in 1971.

== Description ==
St John's Church is located in the old town neighbourhood of Lochwinnoch, Renfrewshire, known as Johnshill. There is a 1729 date on the lintel. The church was built with coursed rubble with ashlar dressings. The surviving features of the church are the south-west stepped gable and single bay, clock and bellcote. The surviving doorway is bordered by small blocked window openings. The working clock sits high on the gable end is topped by a birdcage bellcote with a slate bell-cast roof. Blocked, round-headed paired windows sit beneath the discharging arch. The church is encircled by a stone cemetery wall with square gateposts topped by ball finials and cornices, and cast-iron gates.

== History ==
St John's Church in Lochwinnoch, also known as “St Winnock's Church” and colloquially as “Auld Simon,” has a date of 1729 on its lintel, but the original church may be much older. The clock was installed in 1731. It is historically associated with nearby Paisley Abbey. Originally dedicated to "St Winnock", after the Reformation the church was renamed St. John's Kirk. The church was abandoned after it fell into disrepair. A new church was erected on Church Street in Lochwinnoch in 1808. When the church was abandoned, it was dismantled except for the gable. The local weavers had protested the demolition of the gable and its working clock, so the gable was left untouched. The clock is maintained by local volunteers

The church and surrounding walled cemetery was listed in 1971 as Category B listed.

== Gallery ==
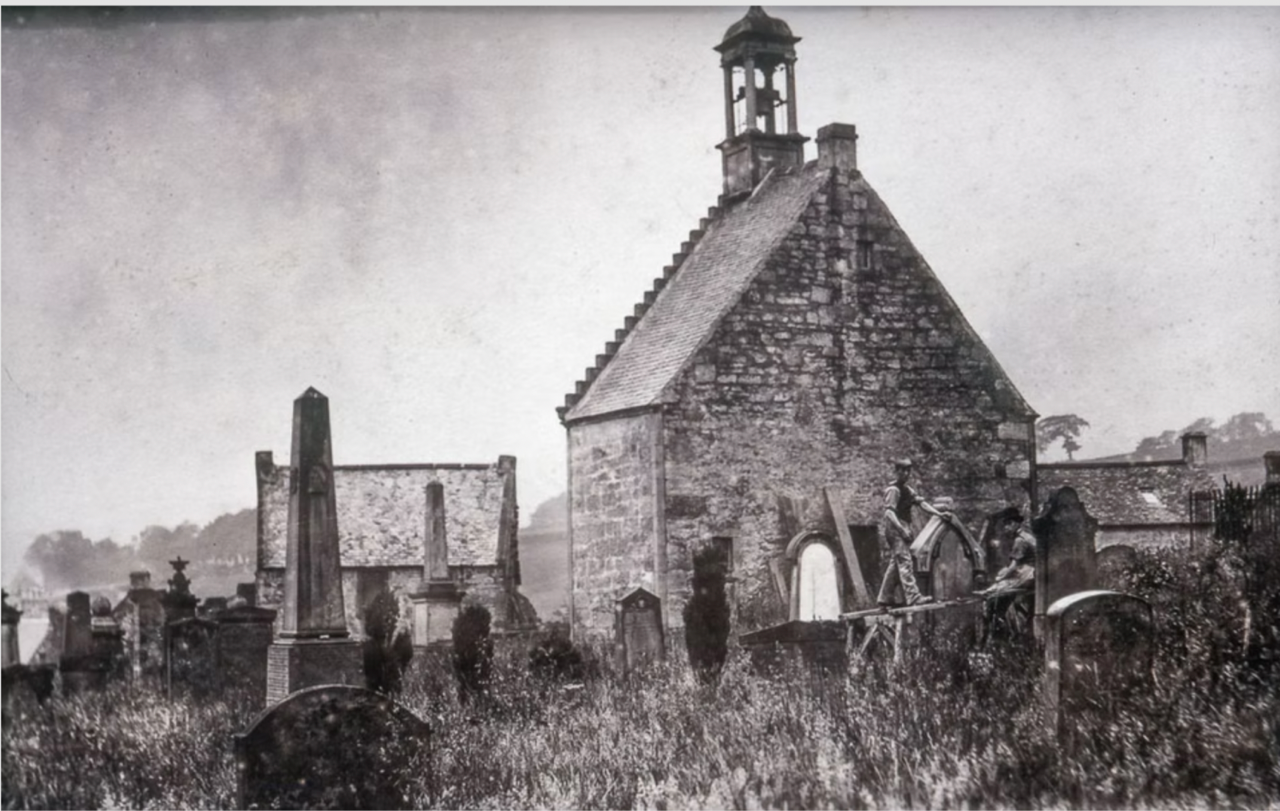
View of church, 1890s

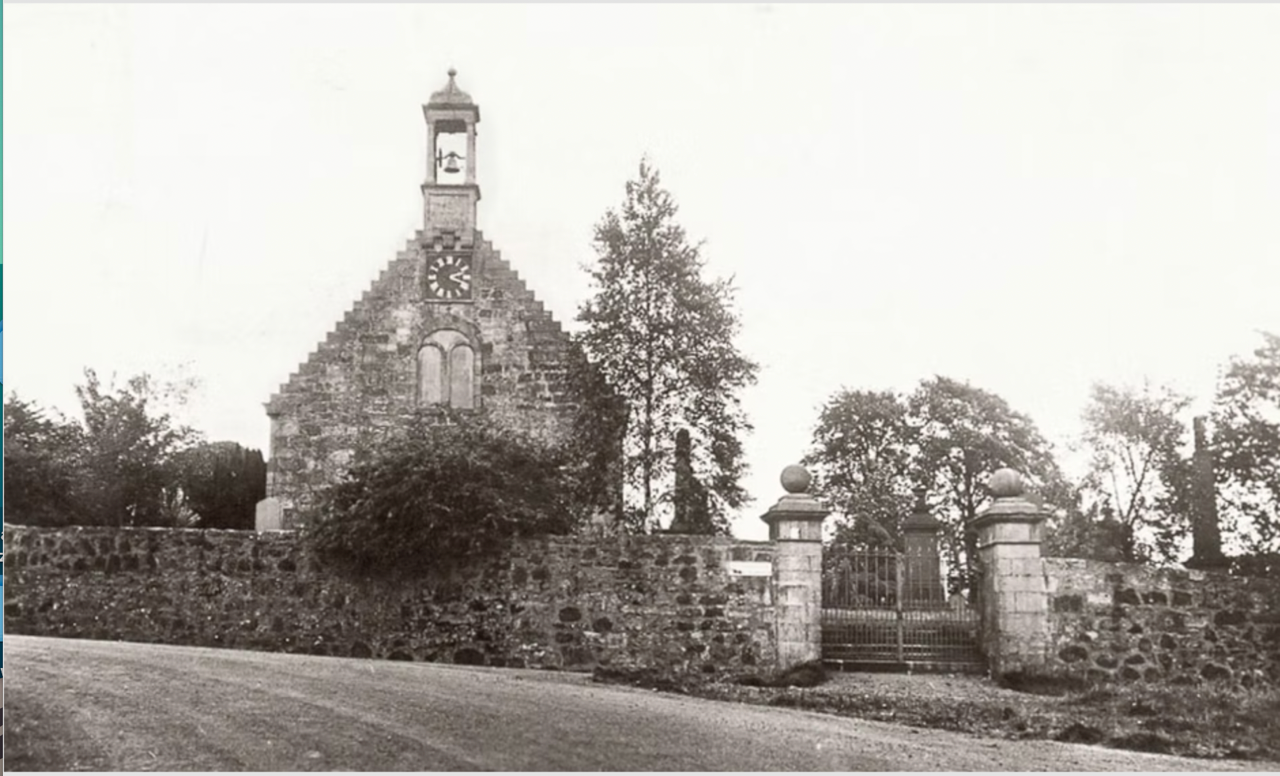
View of church, 1920

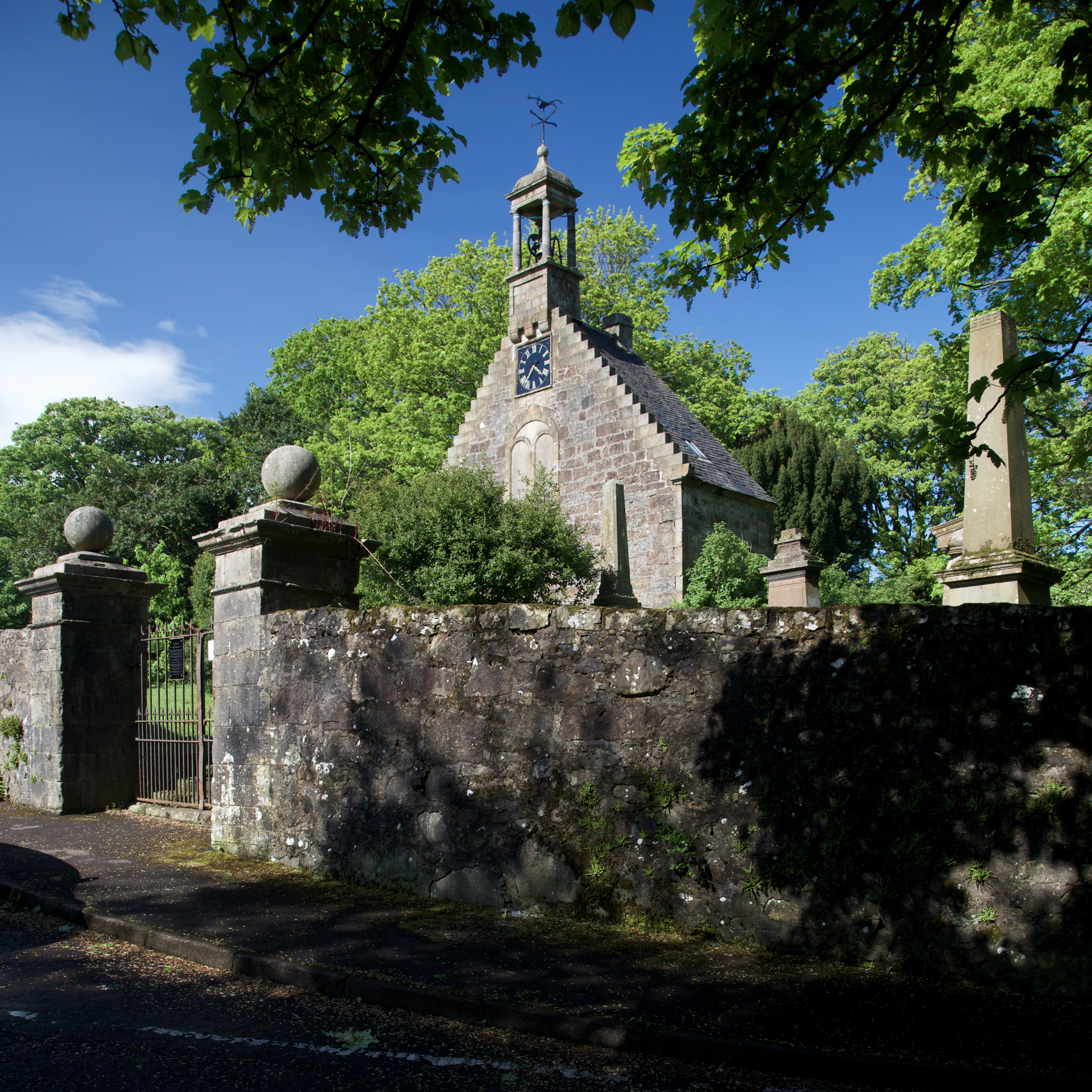
View of church, 2016

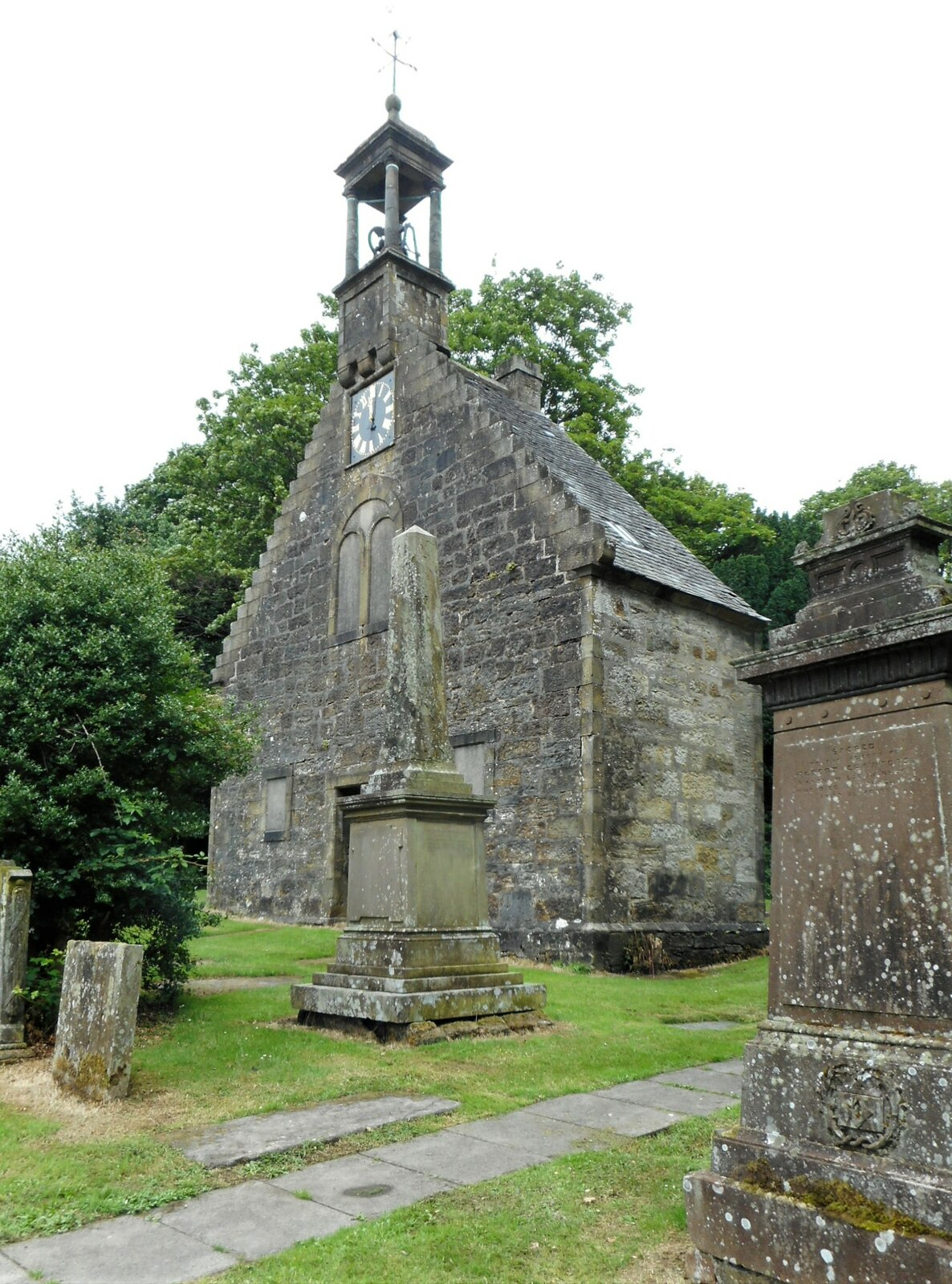
Church & graveyard, 2023

== See also ==
- List of listed buildings in Lochwinnoch, Renfrewshire
