= Castle Semple Loch =

Freshwater loch in Renfrewshire, Scotland

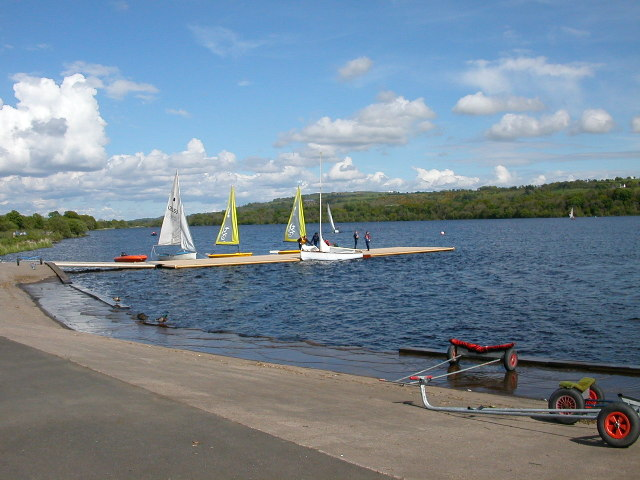
- Watersports on Castle Semple Loch

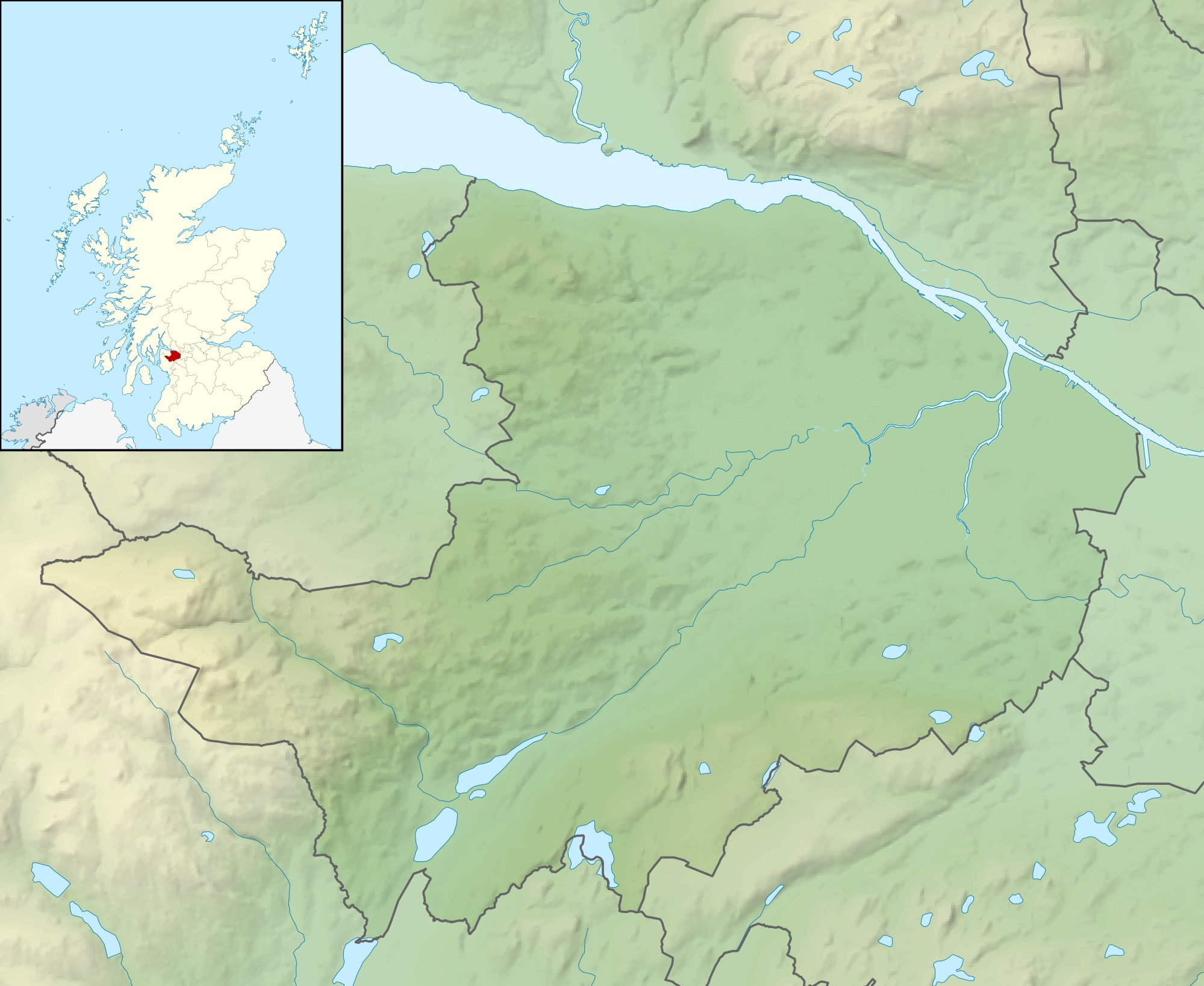
- Location within Renfrewshire
- Location: Renfrewshire, Scotland
- Coordinates: 55°47′N 4°36′W
- Primary inflows: River Calder
- Primary outflows: Black Cart Water
- Basin countries: Scotland
- Max. length: 2.5 km (1.6 mi)
- Max. width: 0.6 km (0.37 mi)
- Settlements: Lochwinnoch

Castle Semple Loch is a 1.5-mile-long (2.4-kilometer) inland freshwater loch at Lochwinnoch in Renfrewshire, Scotland. Originally part of an estate of the same name, it is now administered by Clyde Muirshiel Regional Park as a watersports centre. An RSPB bird sanctuary is located on the loch's southern shore.

== Loch history ==
Arms of the Lord Sempill

Early authors, such as Hector Boece (1465–1536), often use the term 'Garnoth' or 'Garnott' and may be referring to a single large loch incorporating Kilbirnie Loch and Loch Winnoch (Barr and Castle Semple Lochs). Boece in his book of 1527 the 'Historia Gentis Scotorum' (History of the Scottish People), says that this entity was nocht unlike the Loch Doune full of fische.

There is a long history of drainage schemes and farming operations in the Lochwinnoch area, with co-ordinated attempts dating from about 1691 by Lord Sempill, followed by Colonel McDowal of Castle Sempil in 1774, James Adams of Burnfoot, and by others. Until these drainage works Loch Winnoch and Kilbirnie Loch nearly met and often did during flooding, to the extent that, as stated, early writers such as Boece, Hollings and Petruccio Ubaldini regarded the lochs as one, using the name 'Garnoth' or 'Garnott'.

The Castle Semple and Barr Lochs lie in an area previously covered by one large loch known as 'Loch Winnoch', however by the end of the 18th century silt from the River Calder had divided the loch into two and thus Castle Semple and Barr Loch became separate entities. In 1814 Barr Loch and the Aird Meadow was bunded and drained, however after WW2 the area was gradually abandoned for any agricultural use.

Harvey of Castle Semple refused the use of Castle Semple loch to the Royal Curling Club for the Grand Match or bonspiel; he could spare no part of the 2-mile-long loch; however, his neighbour, McDowall of Garthland, offered the Barr Meadow, which he flooded to a depth of two to three feet, thereby providing a safe alternative venue. The event of 11 January 1850 was very successful and attracted huge crowds. The North won for the first time by a majority of 233 shots.

The Loch has hosted the Scottish Rowing Championships and the Home International Regatta.

== Buildings ==
The ruins of the early mediaeval Peel Tower stand on the southern shore of the loch at Air Meadow, now accessible via a boardwalk from the RSPB reserve. This tower was probably used as a fortified stronghold by the people of the area around the loch for defense against bandits and other dangers, as only the locals knew the safe paths through the marsh.

The ruins of the small sixteenth-century Collegiate Church can be found on the northern shore along a well-maintained path. It was built in 1504 by John, Lord Sempill, in the grounds of the original (13th-century) Castle Semple, and is now in the care of Historic Environment Scotland.

Although the house itself burnt down at the beginning of the 20th century, the grounds of Castle Semple on the loch's northern shore still contain the walls of the old walled garden as well as much of the surrounding wall and one of the gates.

There is also an octagonal structure, known as The Temple, on top of Kenmuir hill near the house, which was built in the 18th century.

== See also ==
- Clyde Muirshiel Regional Park
- Kilbirnie Loch
