= River Calder, Renfrewshire =

River Calder
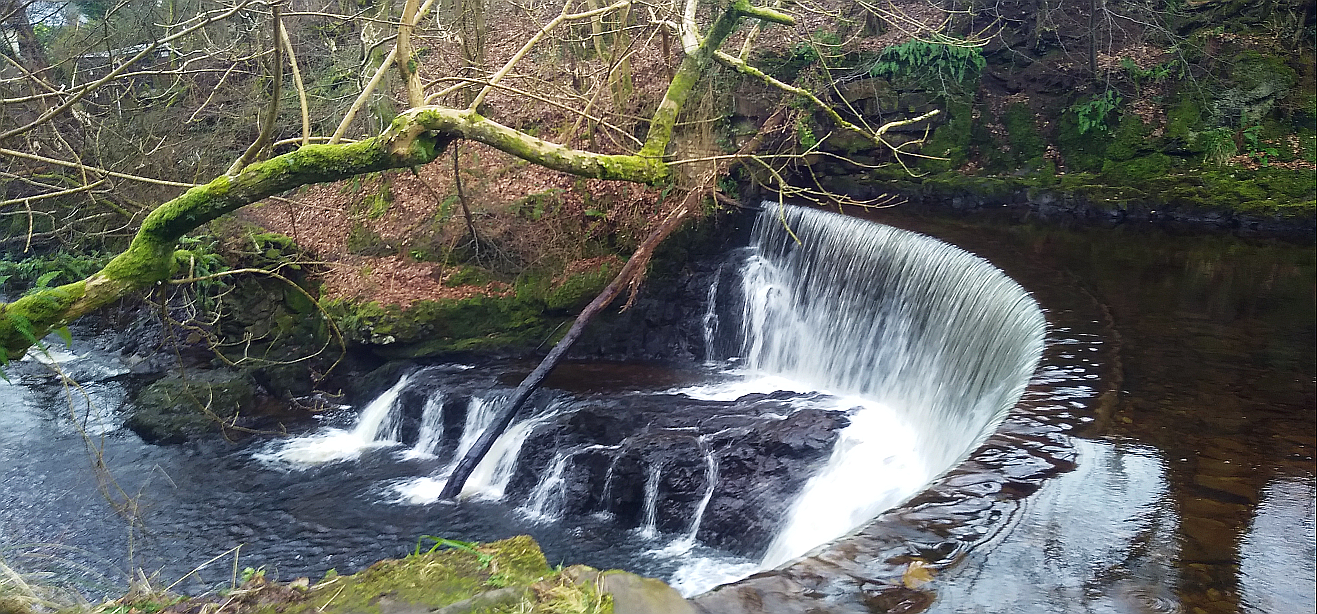
- The River Calder
- Native name: Caladar (Scottish Gaelic)

Location
- Country: Scotland
- Council area: Renfrewshire (mainly)
- Towns/villages: Lochwinnoch

Physical characteristics
- Mouth: Castle Semple Loch
  - coordinates: 55.79285°N 4.61739°W

The River Calder (Scottish Gaelic: Caladar) is a river mainly within Renfrewshire, Scotland.

== River course ==
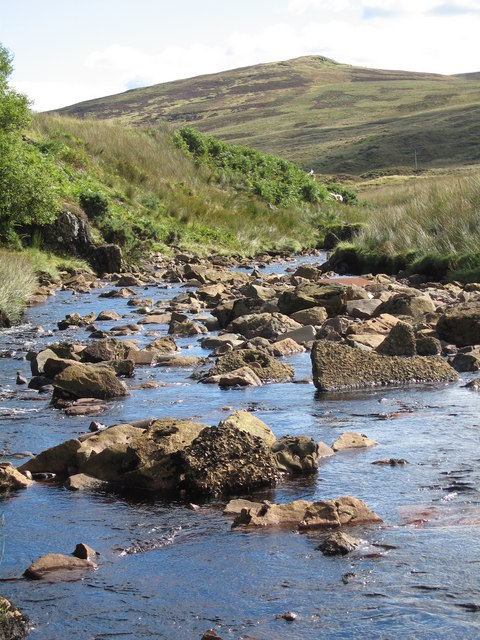
River Calder in Clyde Muirshiel Regional Park

The river rises in the hills to the west of the county and for some of its length forms the border between Renfrewshire and its neighbouring council areas of North Ayrshire and Inverclyde. The only significant settlement which the river runs through is Lochwinnoch, before flowing into the nearby Castle Semple Loch which drains into the Black Cart Water.
