= The Peel of Castle Semple =

- Castle Semple Loch, Renfrewshire, Scotland grid reference NS 3617 5876

Site information
- Owner: Private
- Open to the public: No
- Condition: A ruin

Location
- Peel Tower
- Location within Scotland
- Coordinates: 55.880943°N 4.6640600°W

Site history
- Built: 17th century
- Built by: Semple family
- In use: 17th century
- Materials: Stone

The ruins of The Peel of Castle Semple or the Castle Semple Loch Peel Tower, once designated in Scottish Reformation times as the Defender of the Faith, lie in Castle Semple Loch, in the parish of Lochwinnoch, Renfrewshire, Scotland. The castle stands on a rocky islet which due to drainage works and farming activities has now become linked to the shoreline through a curved earthen embankment. Semple is sometimes written as 'Sempill'; however, for consistency the more commonly found spelling is used here.

== History ==
=== Robert, 3rd Lord Semple ===
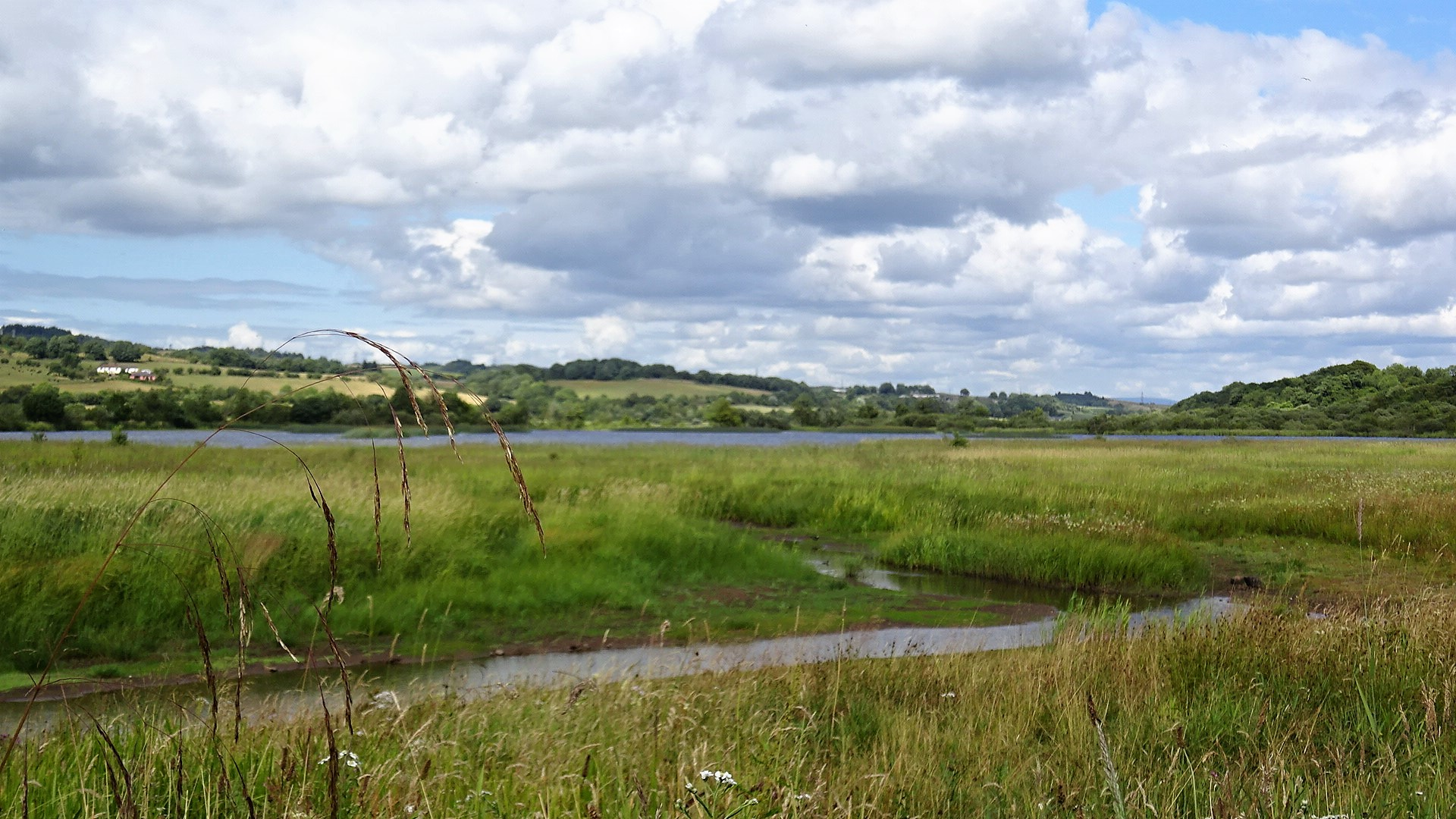
Aird Meadow and Castle Semple Loch with the site of the peel tower lying to the left in the distance.

In August 1560 the Scottish parliament confirmed the "Confession of Faith", but Robert Semple, 3rd Lord Semple, remained a staunch Catholic and continued to take mass and oppose the Scottish Reformation. He was a loyal supporter of Mary, Queen of Scots and the queen regent, Mary of Guise, against the supporters of John Knox, and was described by that personage as "a man sold under sin, an enemy to God and to all godliness.".

In July 1560, the Treaty of Edinburgh had called for peace and reconciliation; however Lord Semple and others continued to commit many murders, stole cattle, burned down houses, set fire to crops and committed crimes even to the extent of "..not sparand to sla auld men of fowr skoir yeris off age, lyand decreppit in their beddis.".

Although called to appear in front of the Justice-General to account for these actions, he instead set about strengthening the garrison and the defences of Castle Semple and had also "..off new fortit ane hows within an ile in the loch of Lochquhinyeoch." This new tower house or peel, built on a rocky island in the loch opposite Lochwinnoch church, is the ruinous fortification that now stands connected via the curved embankment to the Lochside House or eastern side of the shore of Castle Semple Loch.

Although the peel of Castle Semple was built for security, in times of peace it was also used for recreation by the Semples and had a degree of comfort as indicated by the ornately carved stones found within the fortification. It was built shortly before 1560 during the troubled times of the Scottish Reformation as a place of safety and an impregnable retreat.

Lord Semple gave the new fort he built on island in the loch the name "Defender of the Faith". This reflects on the reason for its construction by one who opposed the Protestant faith.

=== The Castle Semple siege and aftermath ===
The Earl of Glencairn put together sufficient soldiers and artillery to attack Castle Semple. Lord Sempill sought refuge in Dunbar Castle with the French Captain Sarlabous, and Castle Semple was held by the Master of Semple and his brother. On 18 September Glencairn's musketeers or "hagbutters" approached the castle yards and Sempill's men shot at them with pistols called "dags" from the windows, not daring to go on the wall heads. The young Earl of Arran joined the besiegers, with the English ambassador Thomas Randolph, and camped in a barn. Randolph wrote that he shared six in a bed.

Despite seven days worth of truly appalling weather he was able on the eighth day to set his artillery in an ideal position and by 3pm the following day the Castle Semple gate house had been destroyed. Glencairn's soldiers attacked through the breach in the walls; however, they were beaten off. The next morning, 19 October 1560, a white flag was seen flying and the siege was over. William Kirkcaldy of Grange and the Laird of Stenhouse negotiated the surrender.

A Captain Forbes with a garrison of ten men were left in charge of Castle Semple and the peel whilst the remainder of the troops dispersed, one side glad to still be alive and the other side content with their pay. The lords went to Hamilton.

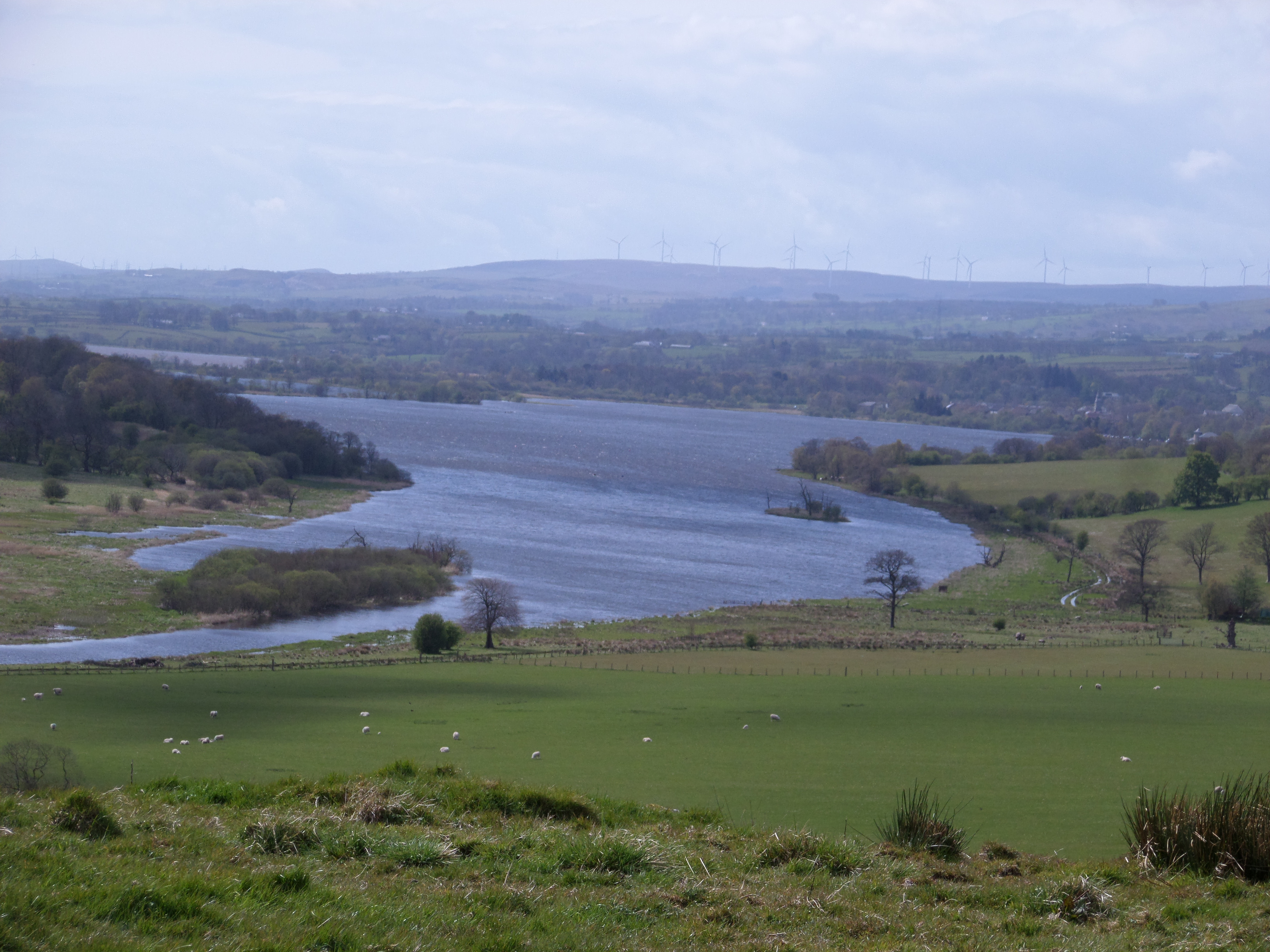
Castle Semple Loch from Kenmure Hill with the site of the Peel Tower in the middle distance.

Lord Semple's son, known in accordance with feudal tradition as the 'Master of Semple' was captured and taken to Hamilton. His father had not been at the castle and in 1561 came to terms with the authorities. The Protestant Reformation in the meantime continued with the Earls of Argyle, Glencairn and others burning down Paisley Abbey, Kilwinning Abbey, Crossraguel Abbey and others.

After the murder in 1567 of Henry Stuart, Lord Darnley, the second husband of Mary Queen of Scots, Lord Semple changed sides and was very active in the queen's downfall and imprisonment.

Lord Semple had been bailie to Archbishop John Hamilton, a Catholic, who was convicted of art and part in the murder of the Regent Moray and Henry Stuart, Lord Darnley in 1571. Archbishop Hamilton had three children by his mistress, Grizzel Semple, Lord Semple's daughter.

=== The bronze cannons ===
In the 18th and 19th centuries several bronze cannon with octagonal barrels were found in the loch around the peel tower, each carrying a falcon and the insignia 'IRS' for James V of Scotland. Probably used at the siege, one was kept at Castle Semple House and is now lodged in the collections of the Glasgow Museums at the Kelvingrove Museum. These may have originally been lost during transportation or were deliberately placed there to disarm the peel tower and prevent further immediate use.

== Castle Semple Loch ==
Castle Semple Loch was at one time around 4.5 miles long and nearly a mile wide; however, the loch was the subject of much drainage work between 1680 and 1774, resulting in around 400 acres of acres of rich land such as Aird's Meadow being made available for cultivation and grazing with a concomitant loss of surface area and depth of water. Some this had to be reversed to provide for mills powered by the Black Cart Water. In William Roy's map of circa 1747–1755 the peel is shown on an irregularly shaped isthmus extending from the shoreline at Lochside House and the Black Cart Water shows signs of having been canalised. By 1800 the water level had risen again and the peel is shown on an island.

In 1856 an embankment had been built around the Aird Meadow which was then under cultivation although subject to flooding in winter. The peel was situated on this embankment.

== Description ==
Peel or Pele Towers or tower houses were usually minor fortified keeps, constructed as watch towers in prominent positions where signs of approaching danger could be communicated by signal fires, etc. The Castle Semple Loch example had cannons as shown by the gun ports and probably stood at least three storeys high. The construction of the present day ruins may date from around 1560 when Robert Semple, 3rd Lord Semple was in armed conflict with the adherents of the Scottish Reformation.

Ornately carved stonework was present and the fortification had the overall shape of an irregular pentagon with a sharp end pointed towards the head of the loch.

The ruins have the aforementioned gun ports on the ground floor with a circular spiral stair which once gave access to the living quarters on the floor above. The ground floor cellar had a vaulted ceiling. In an 1856 survey rubbish and stones at the site made it difficult to interpret the layout of the structure.

In 1826 the peel is shown as intact and sitting on an islet connected by a causeway to the shore at Lochside House.

After 1856 most of the rubble and rubbish was removed and much of the lower storey of the peel tower was revealed. The tower walls are still around 3m thick and the quoins are made from dressed stone. The walls to the north-west and to the south-east stand to a height of around 3 m. To the south-west the wall also still stands; however, to the north-east only the foundations remain, probably due to robbing of the stone for use elsewhere such as in the construction of the embankment that encloses Air Meadow. The walls have masonry rubble-cores with external facings of square-faced stone. In the east corner are the remnants of a newel or spiral stair leading to the upper floor.

=== Aird Meadow ===
As states the peel tower was built on an islet in the loch as shown by old maps; however, extensive drainage reduced the size and depth of the loch, and the creation of Airds Meadow involved the formation of an embankment that joins the islet to the shore on the Lochside House side.

In Scots 'Aird' refers to a piece of ground as opposed to a body of water such as in Airds Moss, etc.

=== Access ===
Consolidation work was carried out on the castle ruins and in 2022 a 400m long boardwalk was built that gives direct access to the site, but not to the castle.

== See also ==
- Castle Semple
- Loch Doon Castle
- Barr Castle
- Kilbirnie Loch
