= Solar eclipse of August 21, 1560 =

Total eclipse

- Total eclipse
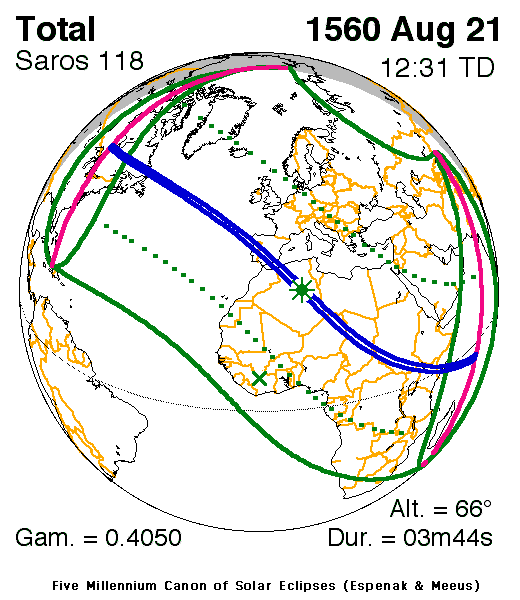
- Map
- Gamma: 0.405
- Magnitude: 1.0469

Maximum eclipse
- Duration: 225 s (3 min 45 s)
- Coordinates: 29.7°N 5.3°E
- Max. width of band: 170 km (110 mi)

Times (UTC)
- Greatest eclipse: 12:30:55

References
- Saros: 118 (43 of 72)
- Catalog # (SE5000): 8451

A total solar eclipse occurred on August 21, 1560. A solar eclipse occurs when the Moon passes between Earth and the Sun, thereby totally or partly obscuring the image of the Sun for a viewer on Earth. Most of the first stages of a solar eclipse can be visible with the naked eye. A total solar eclipse occurs when the Moon's apparent diameter is larger than the Sun's, blocking all direct sunlight, turning day into darkness. Totality occurs in a narrow path across Earth's surface, with the partial solar eclipse visible over a surrounding region thousands of kilometers wide. This eclipse was part of solar Saros 118.

== Mayan predictions ==
Mayan scribes documented the 1560 solar eclipse among others in one of their surviving codices, as analyzed by archaeologist William Saturna. The document features the numbers 4,784, 4,606, and 4,429, with the numbers 177 or 178 inset, estimating the amount of 6 months of lunar phases or semesters. It is believed that based on the lunar cycles of the time this Mayan scribe was recording and predicting solar eclipses (p. 109 - 112).

== Observations ==
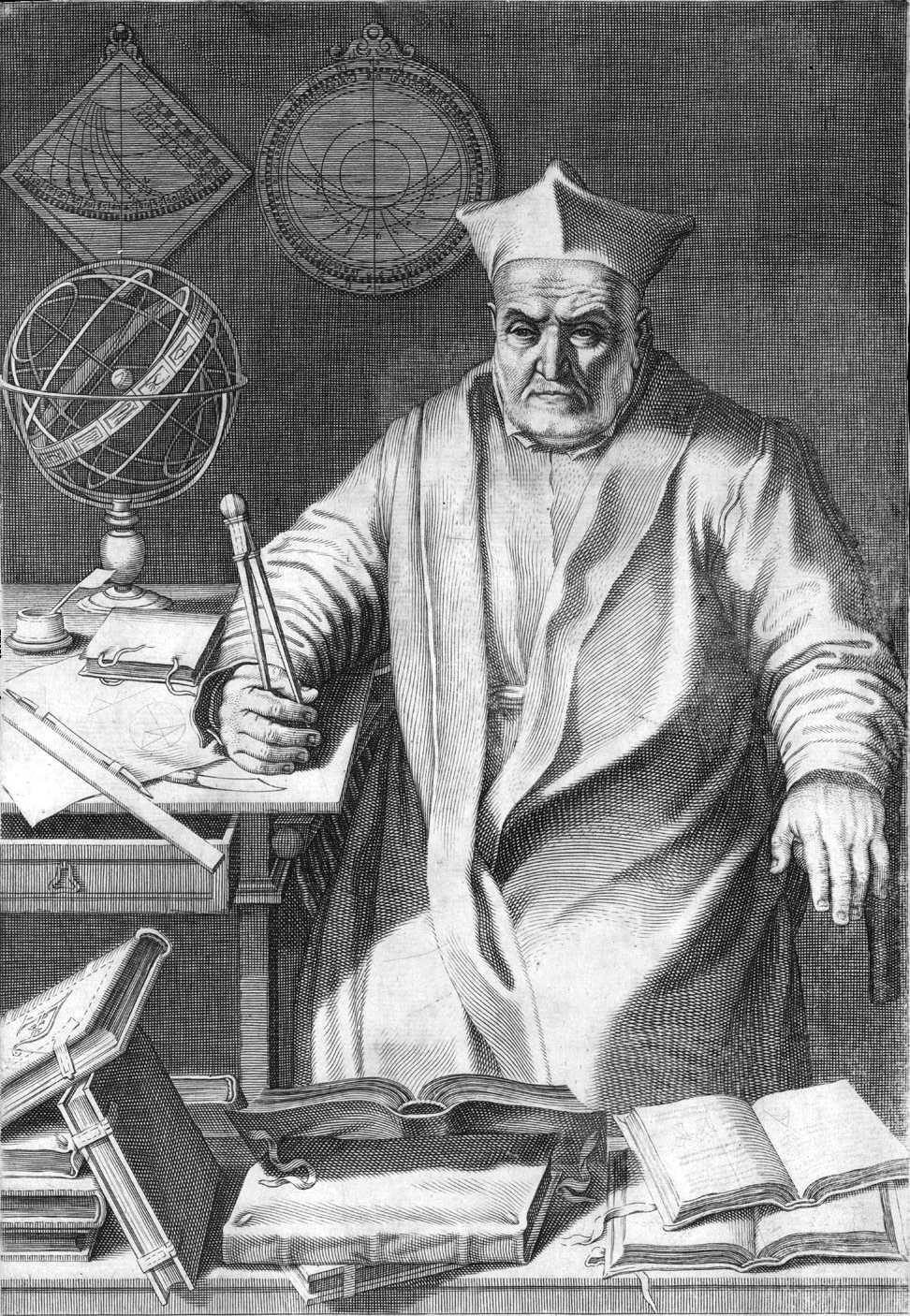
Christopher Clavius

The prediction of this solar eclipse helped to inspire Tycho Brahe's (1546–1601) interest in astronomy at the age of 13. Tycho was born on December 14, 1546, in Knudstrup, in what is now South Sweden, which then was part of Denmark.

In the beginning of the 16th century, people started to observe eclipses and began to enter scientific and historical records. “The whole sun was not eclipsed but that there was a bright circle all around,” wrote the Jesuit astronomer – mathematician, Christopher Clavius upon seeing the eclipse of 1567 (p. 137).

Christopher Clavius wrote (in Sphaeram Ioannis de Sacro Bosco Commentarius published in 1593) "I shall cite two remarkable eclipses of the Sun, which happened in my own time and thus not long ago. One of these I observed about midday at Coimbra in Lusitania (Portugal) in the year 1559 [sic], in which the Moon was placed between my sight and the Sun with the result that it covered the whole Sun for a considerable length of time. There was darkness in some manner greater than night; neither could one see where one stepped. Stars appeared in the sky and (marvelous to behold) the birds fell down from the sky to the ground in terror of such horrid darkness."
