= Barr Castle =

Late medieval tower house in Scotland

- Lochwinnoch, Renfrewshire, Scotland; GB grid reference NS3468058156
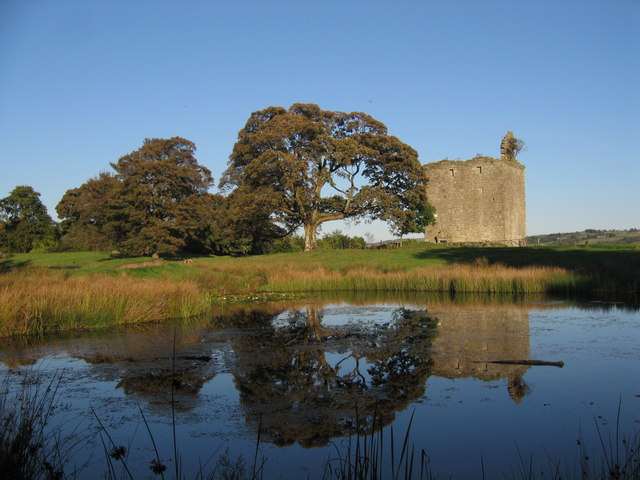
- Barr Castle

Site information
- Owner: Private
- Open to the public: No
- Condition: Ruin

Location
- Shown within Scotland
- Location within Scotland
- Coordinates: 55.7883°N 4.6382°W
- Height: 12M

Site history
- Built: 16th century
- In use: Until 18th century
- Materials: Stone

Barr Castle is a late medieval tower house. It can be seen today as a ruin on a low ridge to the south of the village of Lochwinnoch, Renfrewshire, Scotland.

== History ==
Barr Castle was constructed in the 15th or early 16th century. It passed into the hands of the Hamiltons of Ferguslie at the end of the 16th century. They retained the castle until the late 18th century, when they sold and abandoned it for a new mansion. The castle is protected as a scheduled monument.

== Architecture ==
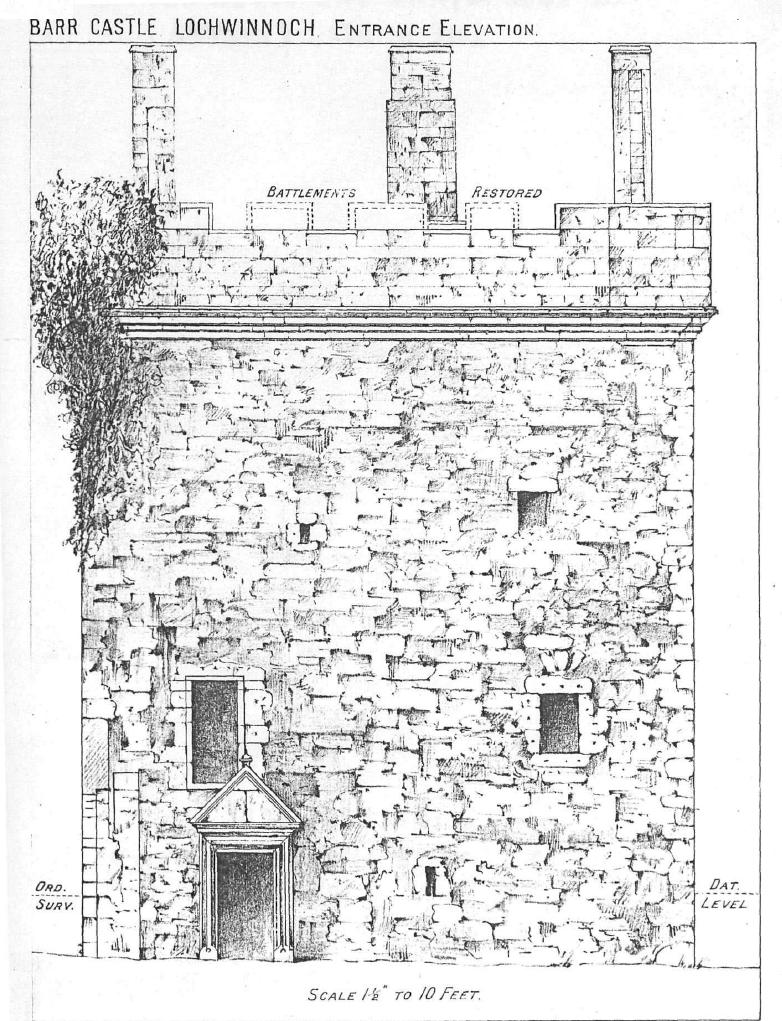
Front Elevation of Barr Castle

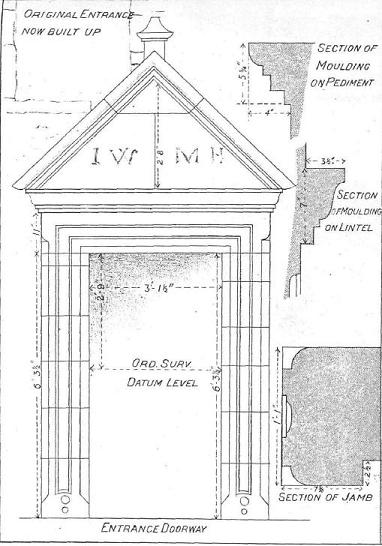
Main Entrance

The tower is a simple rectangle on plan, measuring about 7.80m east to west by 10.70m transversely, which stands to the level of the corbelling of the four angle turrets, now gone, about 12.0m high; on its south side, the chimney stack and part of the gable remain.

Externally the castle is very plain, and it depends for its appearance on its mass. The tower has walls of roughly-coursed, square-faced masonry with dressed stone corner-quoins. The only remaining ornamental feature is the pediment above the main entrance, inscribed with the initials of Margaret Hamilton and John Wallace.

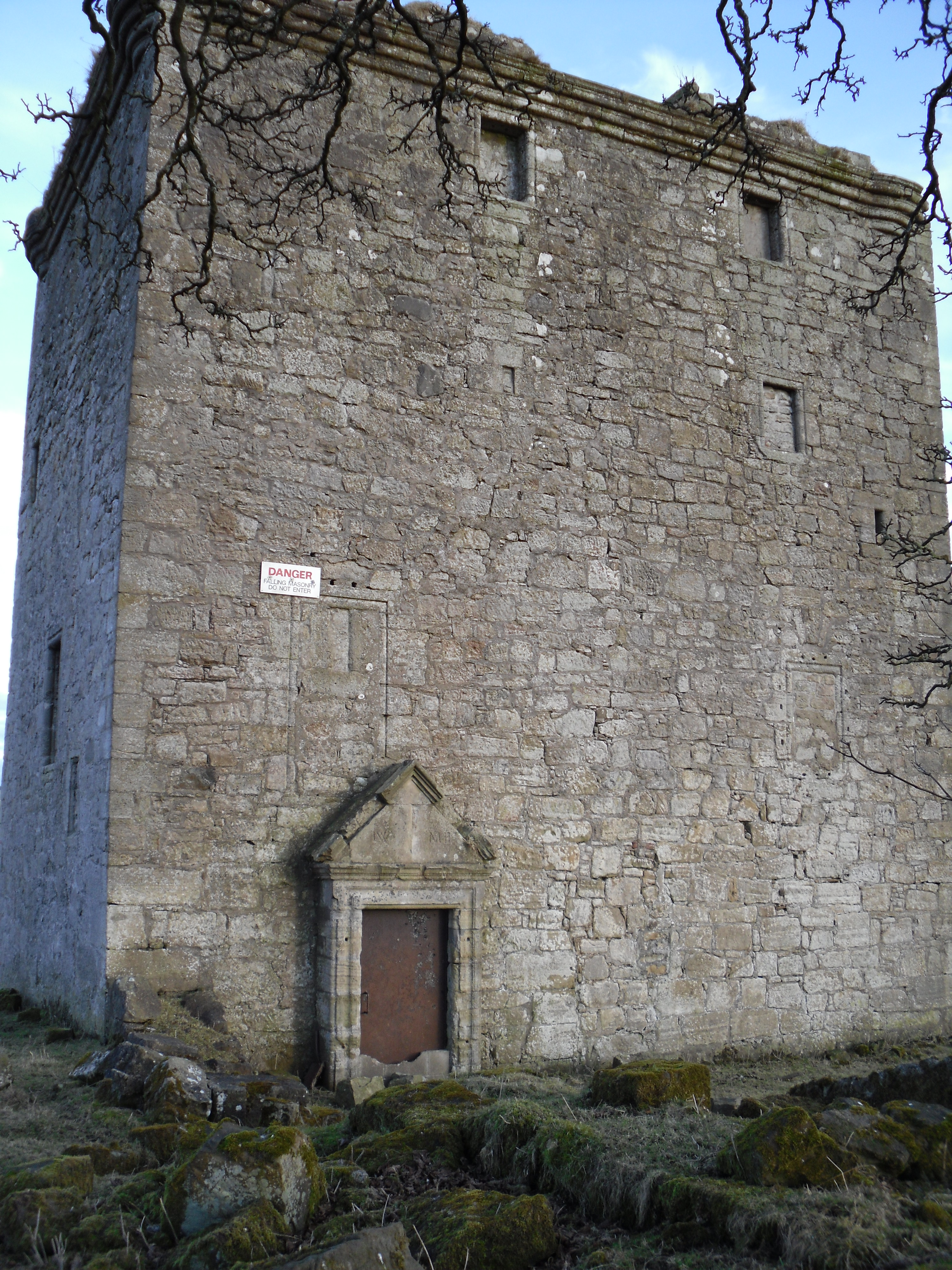
Barr Castle in 2010

The main entrance to the castle is at ground level on the west side. This is a later alteration; the original doorway was on the first floor, reached by a stairway. Window openings survive on all four sides of the building. Also visible on the tower walls are several elements which indicate later alterations, probably in the late 17th century, when the tower was converted into a larger residence.

Little now survives of the courtyard as drawn by McGibbon & Ross in the 19th century. Extant photographs and plans indicate that the courtyard supported various subsidiary buildings, including a wing attached to the southern wall of the tower, now gone.

The ground floor was divided into two apartments, both of which had low vaulted ceilings. The entrance doorway opened into a small passage, from which the two apartments could be formally accessed and where the circular stair to the upper floor started. The kitchen possessed a large and very low arched fireplace.

The hall occupied the whole of the first floor, with light entering from the four sides. The hall differed from the great majority in Scottish castles, the ceiling having been flat and low instead of the usual loftily arched form. It is evident from the existing plans of the second floor that it had been divided into two apartments by a light partition starting from between the doors of the two garderobes in the south wall. The two staircases would have given separate access from the hall below to each of these two rooms. The third floor had, like the second floor, been divided into two apartments, with a garderobe for each and separate access from the hall as on the floor below. Closets are formed in the thickness of the walls.

The plan of the battlements shows the common arrangement for the protection of the walls before lead came into use. The stones overlap at the joints, and gargoyles are formed on the lower ones. Formerly stairs at the north-west angle led to the battlements as well as the main stair. There was a complete passageway round the top of the building. The corner turrets had been roofed, and checks previously existed for small doors at each, and iron crooks for the hinges. A large gutter, made of stone hollowed on the surface, formed the junction between each turret and the main roof.

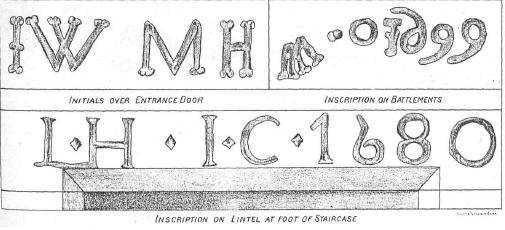
Inscriptions

Various inscriptions are carved into the fabric of Barr Castle. These include IW and MH on the pediment above the main entrance, IH and IC 1680 above the lintel at the head of the stair, and WO 1699 on the battlements. The carvings are the initials of various Hamilton Lairds of Barr, John Wallace and his wife Margaret Hamilton, John Hamilton and Jean Cochrane.

== The Lands of Barr ==
The Poll Tax Roll of 1695 details the farms and settlements comprising the Lands of Barr: these were Sunnyaykers on the Lynthills, Bridgend, Johnshill leaving the village of Lochwinnoch, Cruiks, Knockbarton, Kame and the Barneich farms.

== The Glens of Barr ==
Barr Castle was built by the Glen family. On the death of Alexander Glen in April 1629, the castle passed to the Hamiltons of Ferguslie.

== The Hamiltons of Barr ==
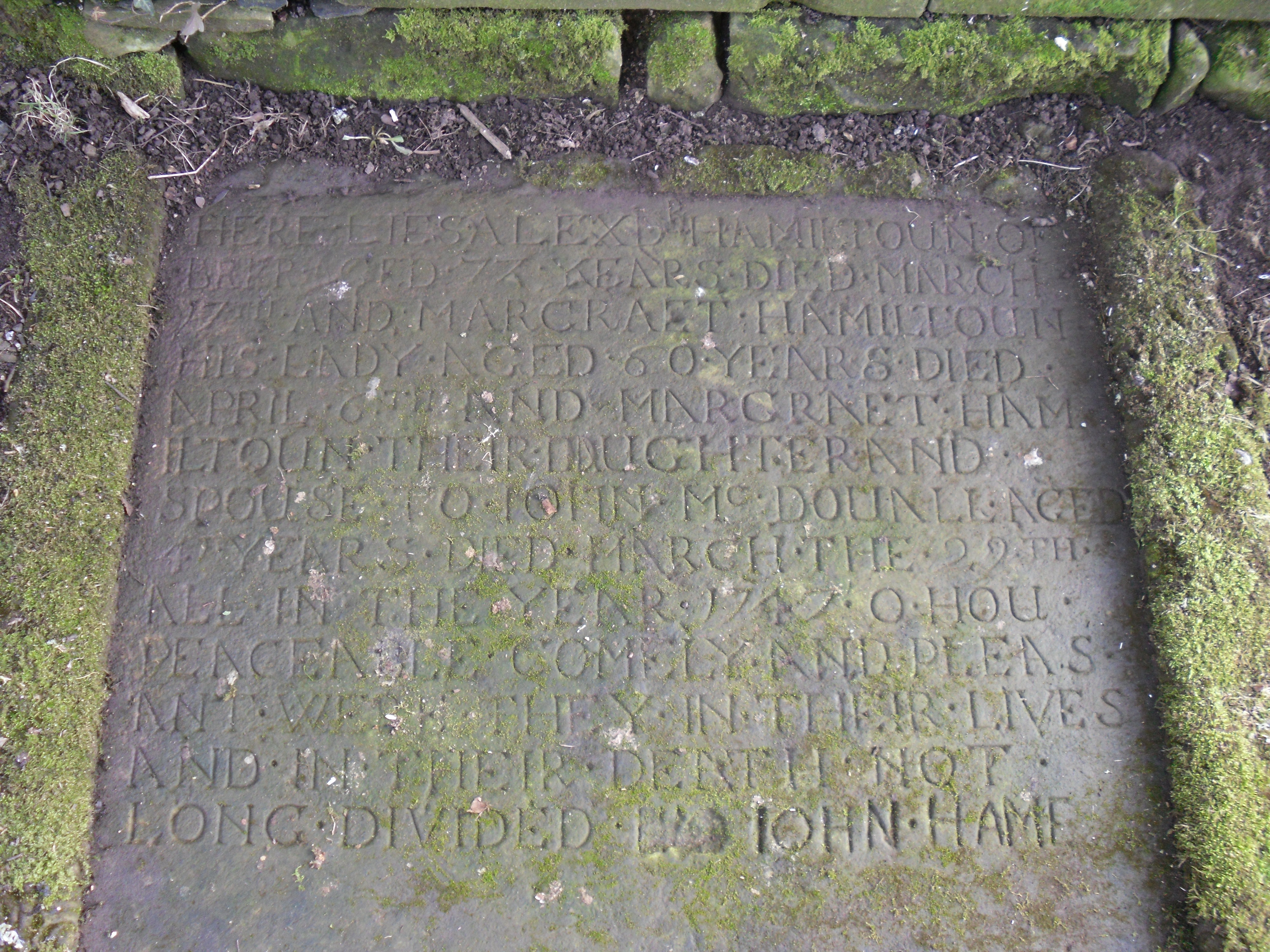
Alexander Hamilton of Barr Gravestone

Margaret Hamilton, eldest daughter of Allan Hamilton of Ferguslie, married John Wallace, second son of William Wallace of Elderslie. It was a term of the contract that the husband was to assume the name and arms of Hamilton. Accordingly on 9 July 1647 a grant under the Great Seal was made to John Wallace of the right to do so, hence the Hamiltons of Barr.

Alexander Hamilton of Barr, great-grandson of Margaret and John, was born in 1670. Listed as 'of Barr,' his name appeared on the 1695 Poll Tax roll for Lochwinnoch. He was appointed a Commissioner of Supply for Renfrewshire the following year. Alexander died in 1747 and was buried in the graveyard of St John’s Kirk in Lochwinnoch. Alexander's grandson John Hamilton sold the estate to the MacDowall family. He died in 1825 and was buried in the family tomb at Lochwinnoch.

== Macdowall of Garthland ==
As of 2011, Barr Castle is owned by Fergus MacDowall of Garthland, Chief of the Clan MacDowall. Because of his status, it is regarded as the clan seat. The MacDowall family have little historical connection with the castle, other than ownership since the 18th century of the land on which the castle was earlier built. The surviving inscriptions, both internal and external, relate to the Hamilton family of the 17th century.

== See also ==
- The Peel of Castle Semple
