= Lochwinnoch =

Coordinates: 55.79255°N 4.62856°W

Lochwinnoch: Scottish Gaelic: Loch Uinneach; Scots: Lochineuch
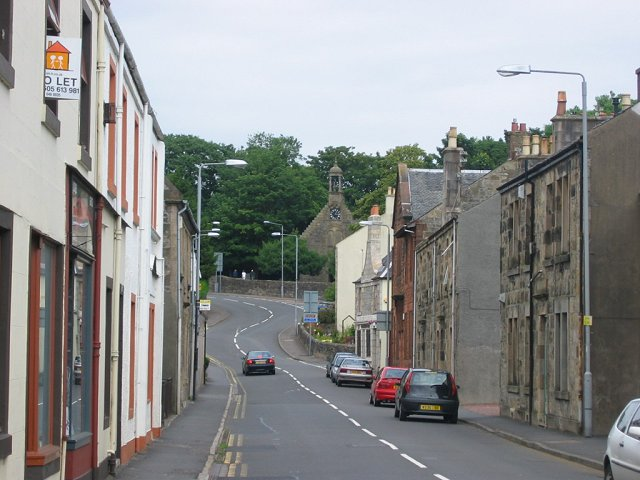
- East end of the High Street with the façade of "Auld Simon" in the centre.

- Location within Renfrewshire
- Population: 2,810 (2020)
- OS grid reference: NS353586
- Council area: Renfrewshire
- Lieutenancy area: Renfrewshire
- Country: Scotland
- Sovereign state: United Kingdom
- Post town: LOCHWINNOCH
- Postcode district: PA12
- Dialling code: 01505
- Police: Scotland
- Fire: Scottish
- Ambulance: Scottish
- UK Parliament: Paisley and Renfrewshire South
- Scottish Parliament: Renfrewshire South

Lochwinnoch (/lɒxˈwɪnəx/; Scots: Lochineuch, Scottish Gaelic: Loch Uinneach) is a village in the council area and historic county of Renfrewshire in the west central Lowlands of Scotland. Lying on the banks of Castle Semple Loch and the River Calder, Lochwinnoch is chiefly a residential dormitory village serving nearby urban centres such as Glasgow and Paisley. Its population in 2001 was 2628 and in 2022 was 2769.

The Town also lends its name to a civil parish of some 50 sq mi (130 km^{2}) of the surrounding countryside, including the nearby village of Howwood. The parish borders seven others: Beith, Kilbarchan, Kilbirnie, Kilmacolm, Largs, Neilston and Paisley.

== History ==
Arms of the Lord Sempill

Lochwinnoch is first recorded in the 12th Century as a parish under the higher control of Paisley and Renfrew, but the area has been inhabited since the Neolithic period.

The 1729 St John's Kirk, also known as Auld Simon (Old Simon) (whose front gable still stands at the eastern end of the High Street), was probably built on the site of a pre-Reformation church dating to the Medieval period. It is dedicated to St. John, hence the name of Johnshill, more properly St. John's Hill, and St. John's well, located in the garden adjacent to the Church Yard.

Janet Pollock and James Tannahill, the parents of Robert Tannahill, were married here on 29 August 1763. Auld Simon's early 19th-century replacement, the Church of Scotland-administered Parish Church, complements the formal open space of Harvey Square, on Church Street.

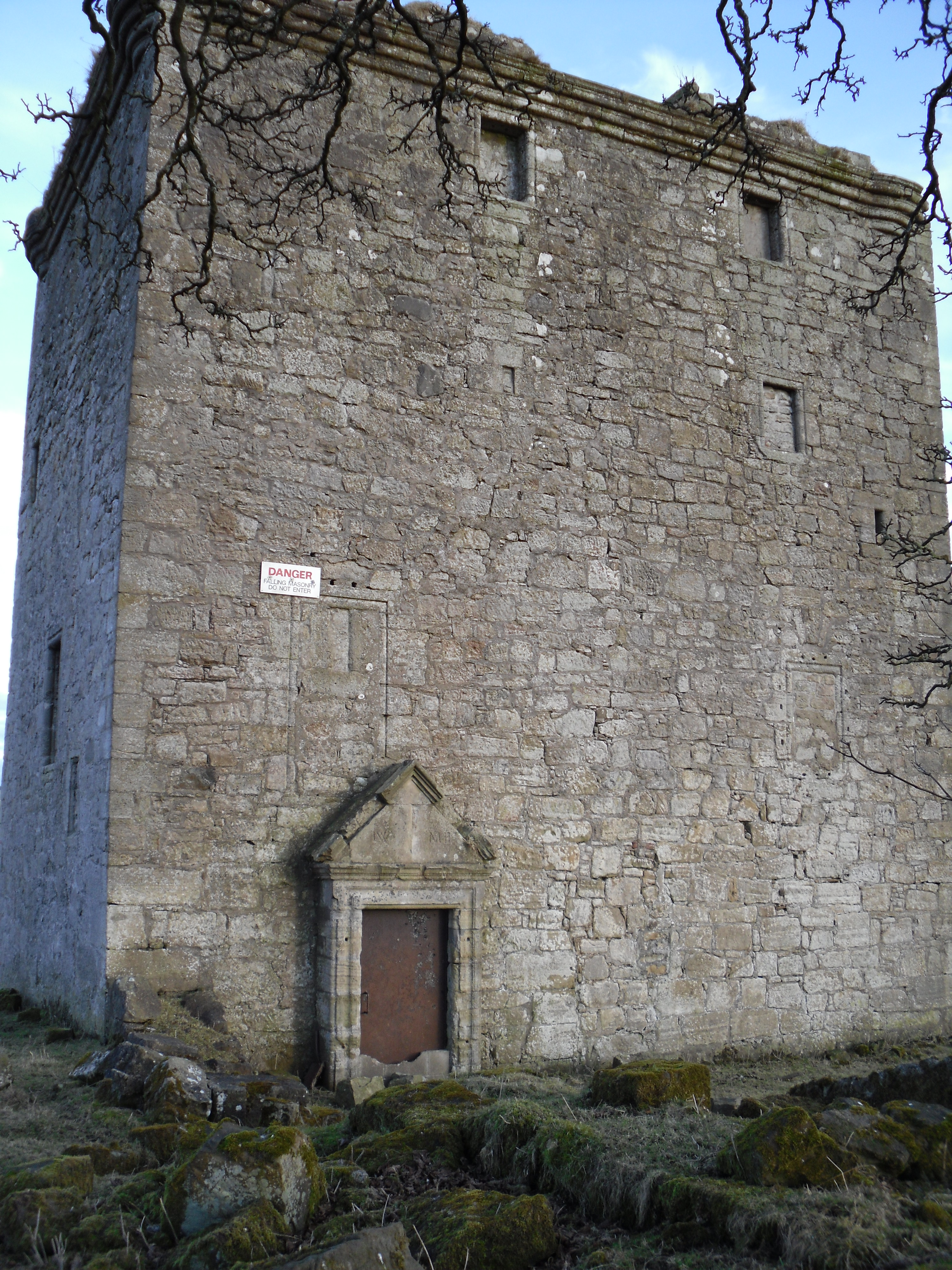
Barr Castle.

Built not far from the village of Lochwinnoch, Barr Castle is a 15th-century keep which was altered in the 16th century (and probably later, too). The gables of the castle have collapsed, apart from the chimney stack which juts up into the sky. Not much survives of the former courtyard of the castle. The main hall was on the first floor, reached by a turnpike stair, which continued to the rooms on the upper floors. It is clearly visible from the A760 road going south from the village to Kilbirnie. It was built by the Glen family but passed in the late 16th century to the Hamiltons of Ferguslie. A door lintel has a date of 1680 and the initials L.H./I.C. The family abandoned it in the 18th century in favour of a new house.

The family, variously known as Sempill, Sempil, Sempel and Semple, had probably owned estates in the area from as early as the 13th century. Robert Semple, Steward of the barony of Renfrew during the reign of Alexander II, was recorded as living in Elliston Castle, whose ruins lie near Howwood. The Semples of Elliston fought for Robert the Bruce, and steadily grew in power to become the Steward's hereditary Baillies of Renfrewshire. They were appointed Hereditary Sheriffs of Renfrewshire and Hereditary Baillies of Paisley. They were later designated as Lords Semple. Their extensive land holdings, Castle Semple, constituted some areas of Lochwinnoch and its hinterland. At some point, probably in the 15th century, the family built a tower keep at the east end of the north shore of the Loch.

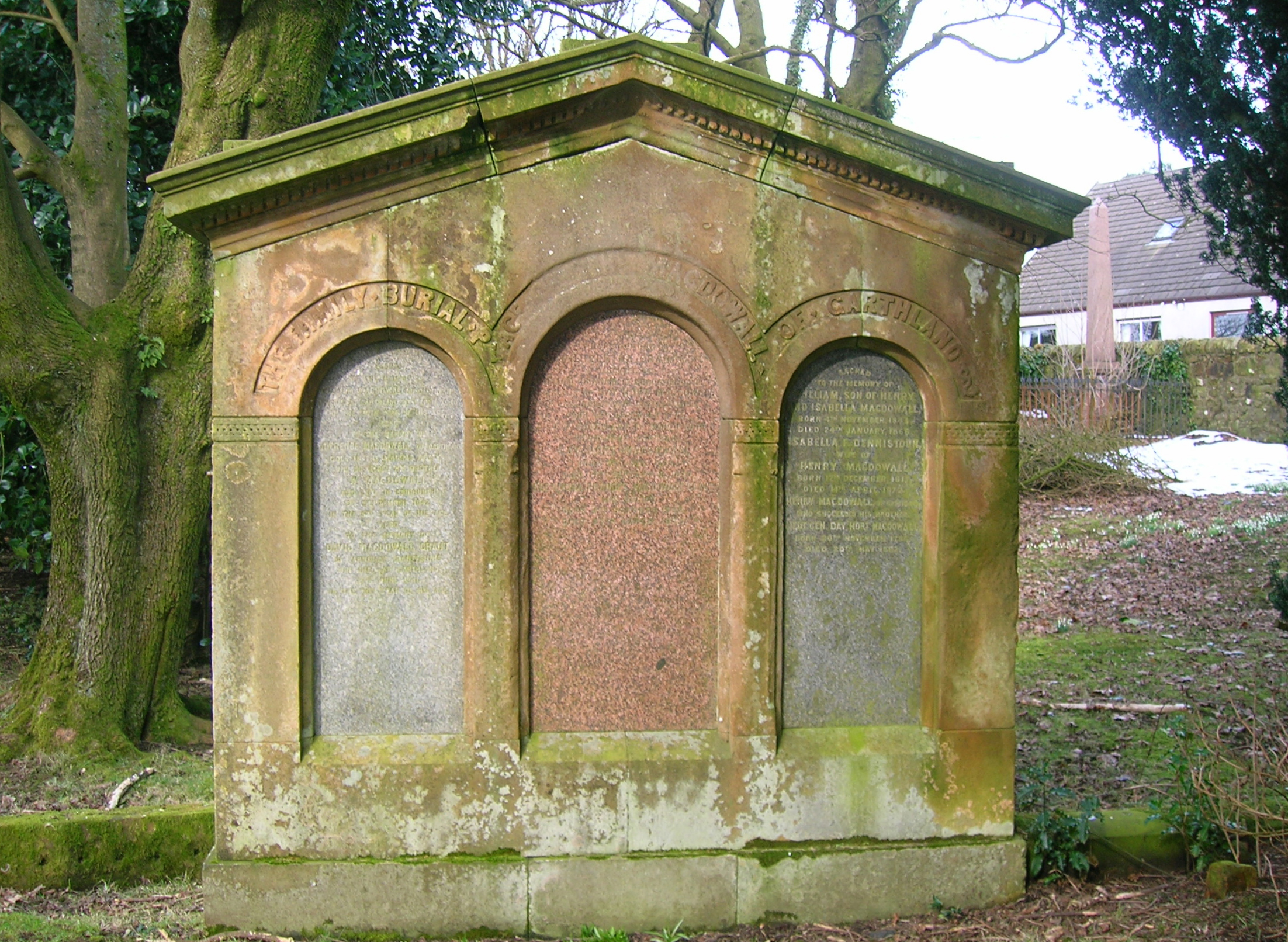
Memorial to the MacDowalls of Garthland, latter day owners of the Castle Semple estate.

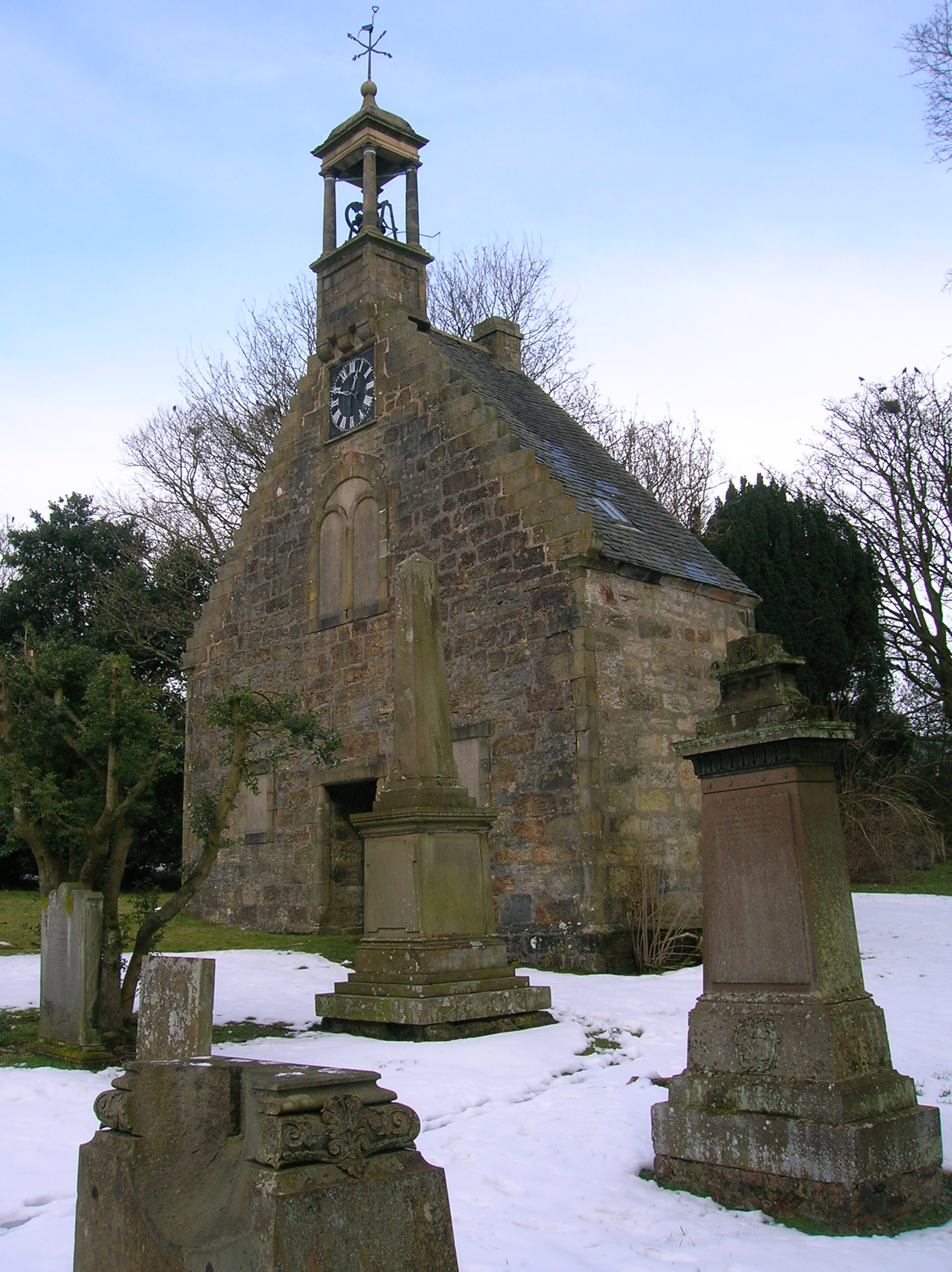
St John's Kirk, c.1729

In 1504 John, the first Lord Semple, built the Lochwinnoch Collegiate Church, which became one of Scotland's finest church schools. Its ruins can be found in Parkhill woods on the edge of the village. John was killed at the Battle of Flodden.

In 1727 the Semples sold the estate to the MacDowalls of Garthland. William MacDowall was one of Glasgow's leading West Indies merchants who owned sugar plantations in the Caribbean. In addition to buying the Shawfield Mansion in Glasgow as his town-house he instructed the rebuilding and expansion of Castle Semple in the grand Palladian style in 1735.

The central part of Castle Semple mansion house burned down in 1924. Castle Semple House remains only as ruined buildings, such as the west gate, the garden wall, and a hexagonal building known as The Temple, which was built in 1770 on a hill overlooking the Loch.

In 1795, nine mills were built in Lochwinnoch, for linen cloth, thread, cotton, wool, etc. The ruins of an old corn mill are located in Millbank Glen near the Route 7 cyclepath at Meikle Millbank. The village was developed from 1788 by the Macdowalls mainly to accommodate the work force. As such, notwithstanding the older Johnshill settlement, the village in its modern form was a planned community, rather than one evolving over time. This planned village lies between the original settlement at East End and the River Calder. Three grand vistas along straight streets are closed by two churches and the estate gates.

Furniture manufacturers, originally from Beith, became established in the village in the 19th century. From the 1860s mechanised furniture manufacturing in Scotland was led by factories in the Lochwinnoch and Beith districts, and became dominated by seven major companies, of which Joseph Johnstone & Co Ltd of Lochwinnoch was the largest in Scotland, specialising in dining room furniture of the highest quality. Lochwinnoch-made furniture was to be found on the great Clyde-built liners, including the world's largest liners RMS Lusitania, RMS Queen Mary, RMS Queen Elizabeth and also the ill-fated Belfast-built RMS Titanic. The Muirshiel Barytes Mine to the north of the village carried out Baryte from the late 18th century, and by 1918 was known as the Muirshiels Mineral Co. of Lochwinnoch. It closed in 1920, then was reopened in 1942, becoming the Muirshiel Barytes Co. and employing workers from Lochwinnoch and Kilbirnie. Production ended in 1969; the remaining tracks and structures now form a feature near the Muirshiel Visitor Centre in the country park.

Today, Lochwinnoch chiefly serves as a residential village, as well as a satellite to the major city of Glasgow. In 1972, a number of buildings in the village were brought within a newly defined Lochwinnoch Conservation Area as an area of special architectural importance for planning and environment purposes administered by the local authority. Lochwinnoch Primary School, the only school in the village, celebrated its centenary in 2005. In 2003 it was the centre of a notable alien big cat sighting scare. Children were kept inside during break times, and a police helicopter was brought in to search for the animal.

== History of the lochs ==
Lochwinnoch is probably not named after a Loch called 'Loch Winnoch' (the name almost certainly predates the use of the Scots language in the area, since it is Celtic, as mentioned above) being located next to Castle Semple Loch. There is a long history of drainage schemes and farming operations in the Lochwinnoch area, with co-ordinated attempts dating from about 1691 by Lord Sempill, followed by Colonel McDowal of Castle Sempil in 1774, James Adams of Burnfoot, and by others. Until these drainage works there was one big loch consisting of Castle Semple loch, Barr loch and, in times of flooding, Kilbirnie Loch. Early writers such as Boece, Hollings and Petruccio Ubaldini regarded the three lochs as one, usually applying the name 'Garnoth' or 'Garnott'.

Therefore, the two lochs of today, Castle Semple and Barr Lochs, lie in an area covered by one large loch which may have been known as ‘Loch Winnoch’ until the end of the 18th century when silt brought down by the River Calder divided the one loch into two, creating Castle Semple and Barr Loch as separate entities.

== Places of interest ==
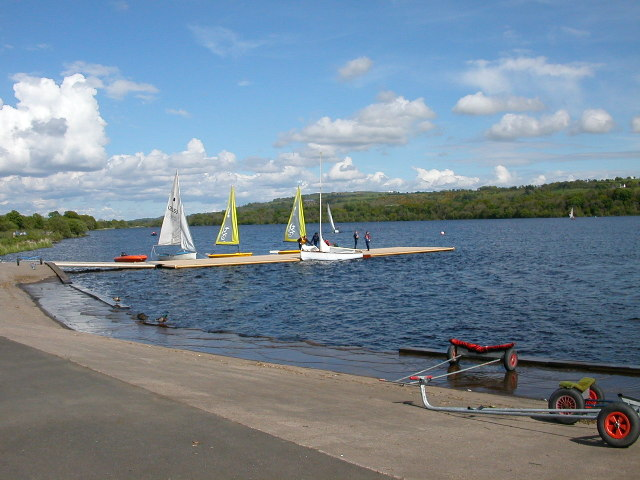
Water sports on Castle Semple Loch

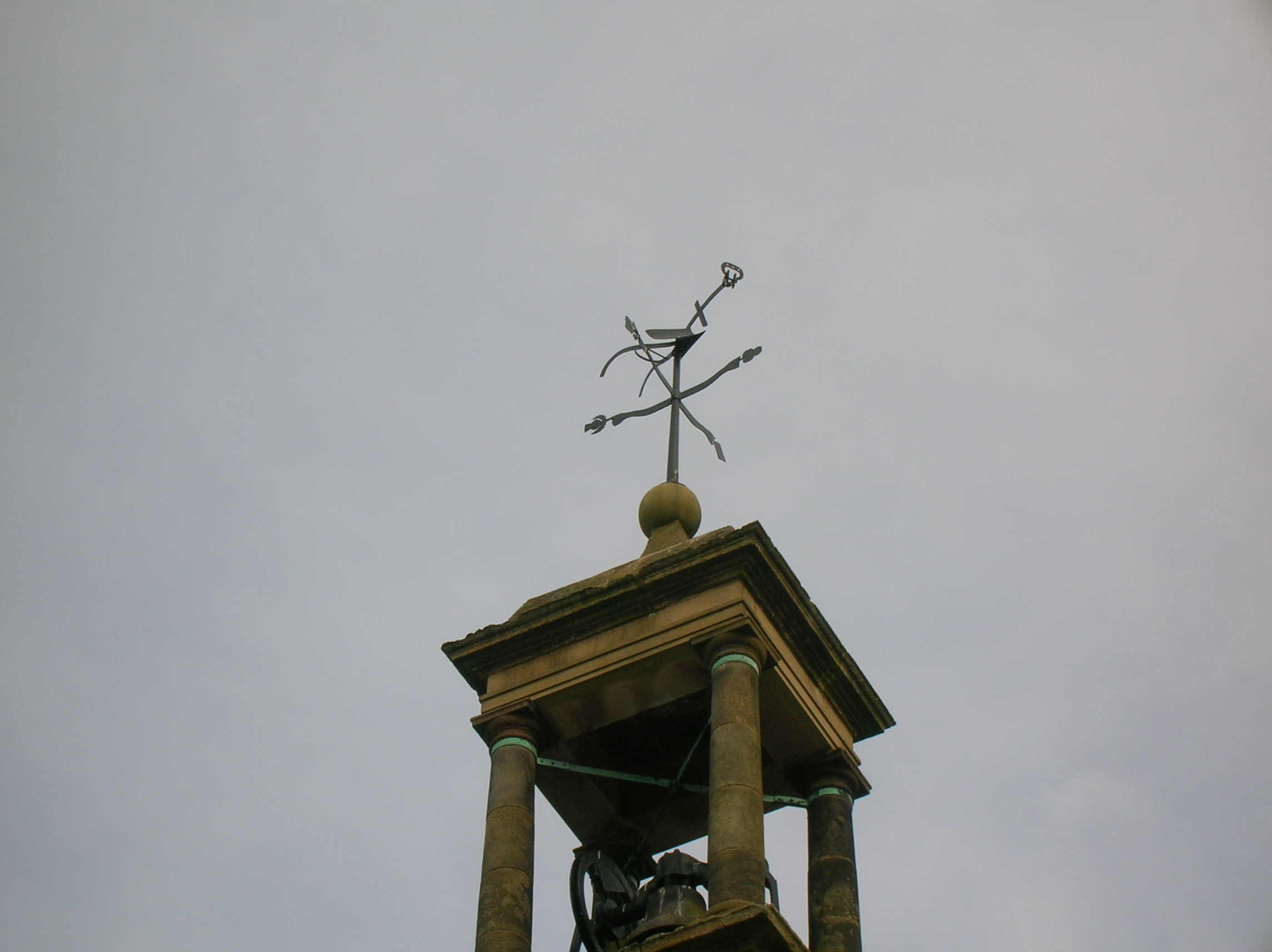
Weather vane with plough design on Saint John's Kirk.

The loch plays host to a variety of watersports, being part of the Clyde Muirshiel Regional Park and an RSPB nature reserve is located nearby. There are three public houses in Lochwinnoch: the Corner Bar, the Brown Bull and the Three Churches Inn (previously the Garthland Arms). There is also a cafe, the Junction Bistro located at the cross, and a restaurant at the Golf Course which is open to non-members. Lochwinnoch Golf Club (eighteen holes) is on Burnfoot Rd.

There are three places of worship in the village: Lochwinnoch Parish Church (Church of Scotland) is located on Church Street and meets on Sundays at 11:00, as does the Calder United Free Church, also on Church Street, and Lochwinnoch Angels of Light Spiritualist Church is located in the community park "Annex" on Lochlip Road.

== Notable people ==
- Thomas King (1834–1896), botanist
- Dr Hugh Ferguson Watson FRSE (1874–1946) came to notoriety force-feeding suffragettes in 1914

== Transport ==
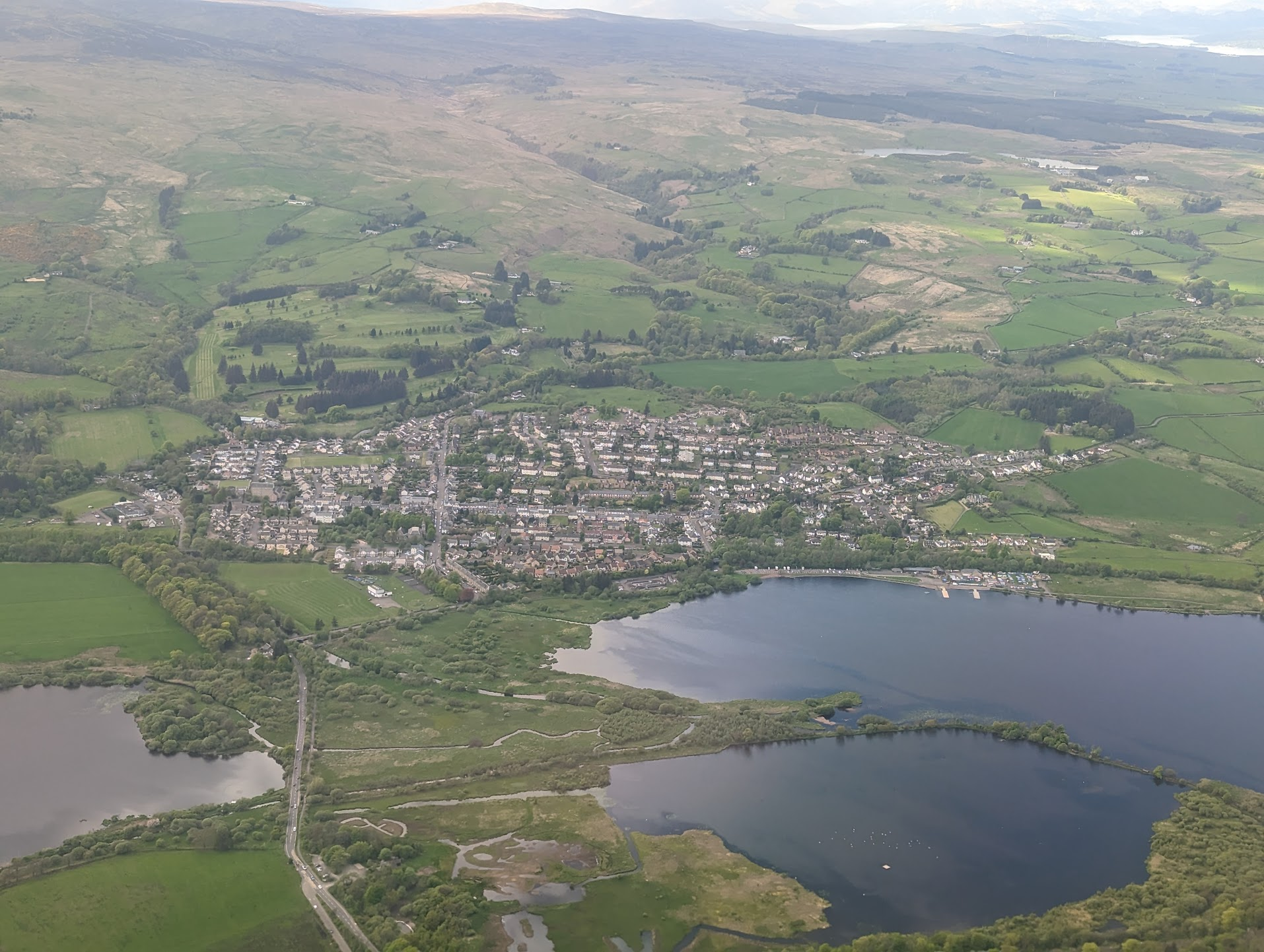
Lochwinnoch from the air, May 2023

The village is served by Lochwinnoch railway station on the Ayrshire Coast Line. Opened in 1840, it lies to the south west of the village, and is unstaffed.

A second Lochwinnoch railway station was opened in 1905 as part of the Dalry and North Johnstone Line, with the first station being renamed Lochside, until reverting to its original name in the 1980s, the station on the north line closed in 1966. The former railway line serving this second station has been converted into a cycle path and is now part of the National Cycle Network's National Cycle Route Number 7, running from Glasgow to Gretna.

Stagecoach South Scotland runs services to Adrossan or Glasgow. McGill’s run services to Johnstone, Paisley and Howwood.

== Schools ==
Lochwinnoch Primary School, the village's only school, is situated on Calder Street. The school was built in 1905 and is a two-story red sandstone building. It celebrated its 100th anniversary in 2005. It has now got an upper and lower school building. The lower building is the original school and the upper school was built to accommodate the nursery which was added to the school.

== See also ==
- The Peel of Castle Semple
