= Clan Sempill =

Lowland Scottish clan

- Crest: A stag's head Argent attired with ten tynes Azure and collared with a prince's crown Or
- Motto: Keep Tryst

Profile
- Region: Lowlands
- District: Renfrewshire

Chief
- The Rt. Hon. James William Stuart Whitmore Sempill
- The 21st Lord Sempill
- Seat: Craigievar Castle
- Historic seat: Castle Semple

Clan Sempill is a Scottish clan of the Scottish Lowlands.

== History ==
=== Origins of the Clan ===
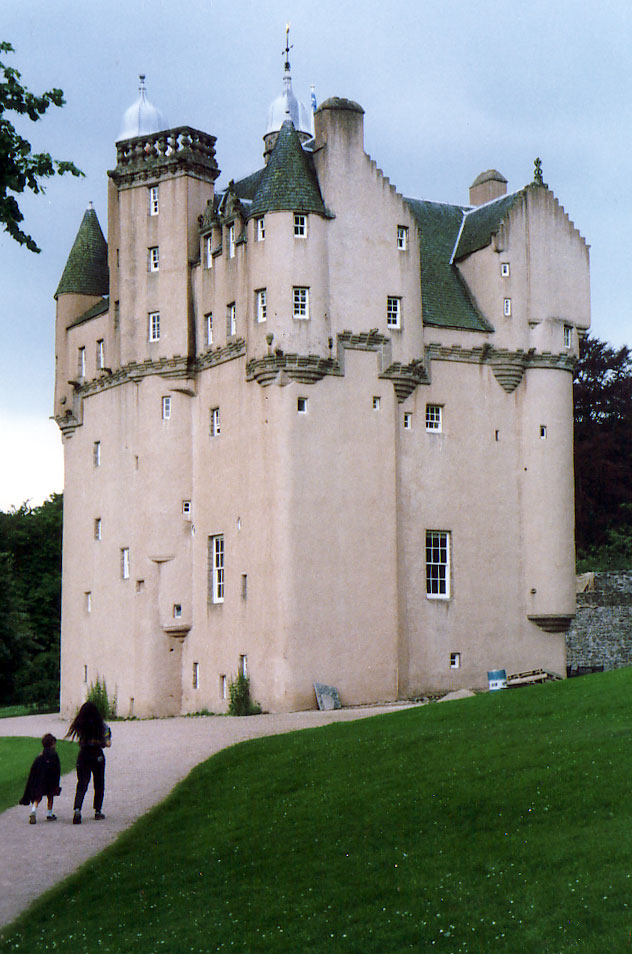
Craigievar Castle, seat of the Chief of Clan Sempill

The name Sempill has been known in Renfrewshire since the twelfth century but its origins are obscure. The suggestions that it is a corruption of 'St Paul' seems unlikely. It also seems an unlikely suggestion that the first person of the name had a reputation for being simple or humble.

In 1246 Robert de Sempill witnessed a charter to Paisley Abbey. Later as a chamberlain he also witnessed a charter of the Earl of Lennox.

=== Wars of Scottish Independence ===
During the Wars of Scottish Independence Robert de Sempill's two sons, Robert and Thomas, supported king Robert the Bruce and they were both rewarded for their services. The elder son received all of the lands around Largs in Ayrshire which had been confiscated from the Balliols. The younger son, Thomas, received a grant for half of the lands of Longniddry.

Prior to 1344 the lands of Eliotsoun, which became the territorial designation of the chief were acquired.

=== 15th and 16th centuries ===
Sir Thomas Sempill fell fighting in support of King James III of Scotland at the Battle of Sauchieburn in June 1488. His only son, John Sempill, inherited the family estates. John was made Lord Sempill during the reign of King James IV of Scotland. In 1505 John founded the Collegiate church of Lochwinnoch. He also rebuilt the castle at the eastern end of the loch which he renamed Castle Sempill. He was killed fighting for the king at the Battle of Flodden in 1513. (See: John Sempill, 1st Lord Sempill).

John was succeeded by his son William who obtained a charter to the lordship with the assistance of the Regent Albany. William favored the betrothal of the child Mary, Queen of Scots to the son of Henry VIII of England.

William's son, Robert Sempill, was constable of the king's Douglas Castle and was taken prisoner at the Battle of Pinkie Cleugh in 1547. Robert was sometimes called the Great Lord Sempill and supported the Queen Regent, Mary of Guise who was the widow of James V of Scotland. Robert's castle was attacked and seized for his opposition to the Scottish Reformation. He was a faithful supporter of Queen Mary until the death of Lord Darnley and he afterwards joined those who promoted Mary's son as King James VI. He fought against the queen at the Battle of Carberry Hill and was one of the signatories on the warrant for the queen to be held in Loch Leven Castle. He also led the vanguard of the Regent Moray's army at the Battle of Langside in 1568 and was rewarded with a charter to the abbey lands of Paisley. After the Regent was murdered in 1570 Sempill was imprisoned for a year. (See: Robert Sempill, 3rd Lord Sempill).

Robert's son, John Sempill, was castigated by John Knox as Sempill the dancer. John was accused of treason and attempting to assassinate Regent Morton and was sentenced to death by hanging, drawing and quartering. However the sentence was commuted to imprisonment and he was later released.

In 1572 John was succeeded by his elder half brother, Robert Sempill as the fourth Lord Sempill. This Robert assisted in the baptism of Prince Henry in 1594 and personally attended on the queen at a banquet that was held in celebration in the great hall of Stirling Castle. Robert was also appointed as a Privy Councillor by James VI of Scotland and was sent as an ambassador to Spain. However, later Robert would not renounce the Catholic faith and held no more public offices. (See: Robert Sempill, 4th Lord Sempill).

=== 17th century ===
Robert Sempill, 6th Lord Sempill supported the royalist cause during the Civil War but was fined under the Commonwealth as a result. The 8th Lord Sempill embraced the Protestant faith. He was the first Lord Sempill to sit in Parliament since the reign of Mary Queen of Scots. He died in 1684 and was succeeded by his sister Anne Sempill.

=== 18th century & Jacobite risings ===
Anne's eldest son was Francis, the tenth Lord Sempill. He was a strong opponent of the union with England. He died unmarried and was succeeded by his brother John Sempill. John Sempill supported the Hanoverian-British Government during the Jacobite rising of 1715. John also died unmarried and the title passed to his brother, Hew (Hugh), who was a professional soldier. Hew Sempill had made a reputation for fighting on the continent. In 1746 he led his regiment on the side of the British Government at the Battle of Culloden, on the left wing of the Government army.

== Clan Chief ==
The Rt Hon The Lord Sempill, James William Stuart Whitmore Sempill, The 21st Lord Sempill, Chief of the Name and Arms of Sempill.

== Castles ==
- Craigievar Castle is the current seat of the chief of Clan Sempill.
- Castle Sempill was an earlier seat of the chief.

== Recorded surname variants ==
In addition to Sempill, recorded variants include: Semple, Sample, Samples, Sampler Simpole, Simble, and Sambell.

== See also ==
- Scottish clan name variants also include Sempel & Sempell
