= Lands of Elliston =

- Howwood, Renfrewshire, Scotland; UK grid reference NS392598
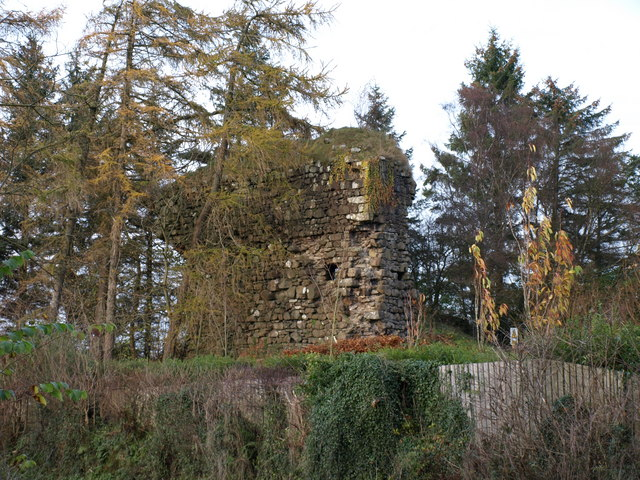
- The remains of Elliston Castle

Site information
- Type: Tower Castle
- Owner: Private
- Open to the public: No
- Condition: Ruined

Location
- Shown within Scotland
- Coordinates: 55.80522°N 4.567575°W
- Grid reference: NS392598

Site history
- Built: 15th century
- Built by: Sempill family
- Materials: Stone

The lands of Elliston, previously Elliotston or Eliotstoun or Elliestoun in the Parish of Lochwinnoch were part of the holdings of the Barony of Elliston, later a part of the Castle Semple barony and estates. The ruins of the castle lie a short distance from Howwood in Renfrewshire in a private garden on a minor road between the A737 and the B776. The name may have derived from earlier holders of the lands, however the Sempill family held them since at least 1220. The castle was abandoned circa 1550 when John Sempill, 1st Lord Sempill moved to a new castle at Castleton which he renamed Castle Semple (NS 377602).

== The History of the Lands of Elliston ==
In 1540 the lands of ''Castleton, Eliotstoun, Schutirflat, Nethir-Pennell, Hairstontoun, Lavane, Bargane and Lecheland'' were incorporated into the new Barony of Semple, together with other lands in Lanark and Ayr. The new barony was held by William, Lord Sempill and the principal dwelling or messuage was Castle Semple. Most of the lands within the parish of Lochwinnoch were once held by the Semples of Elliston.

In 1505 James IV of Scotland visited John Sempill's at Elliston his collegiate church at Castle Semple to which he gave an offering of 14 shillings.

=== The Lairds ===
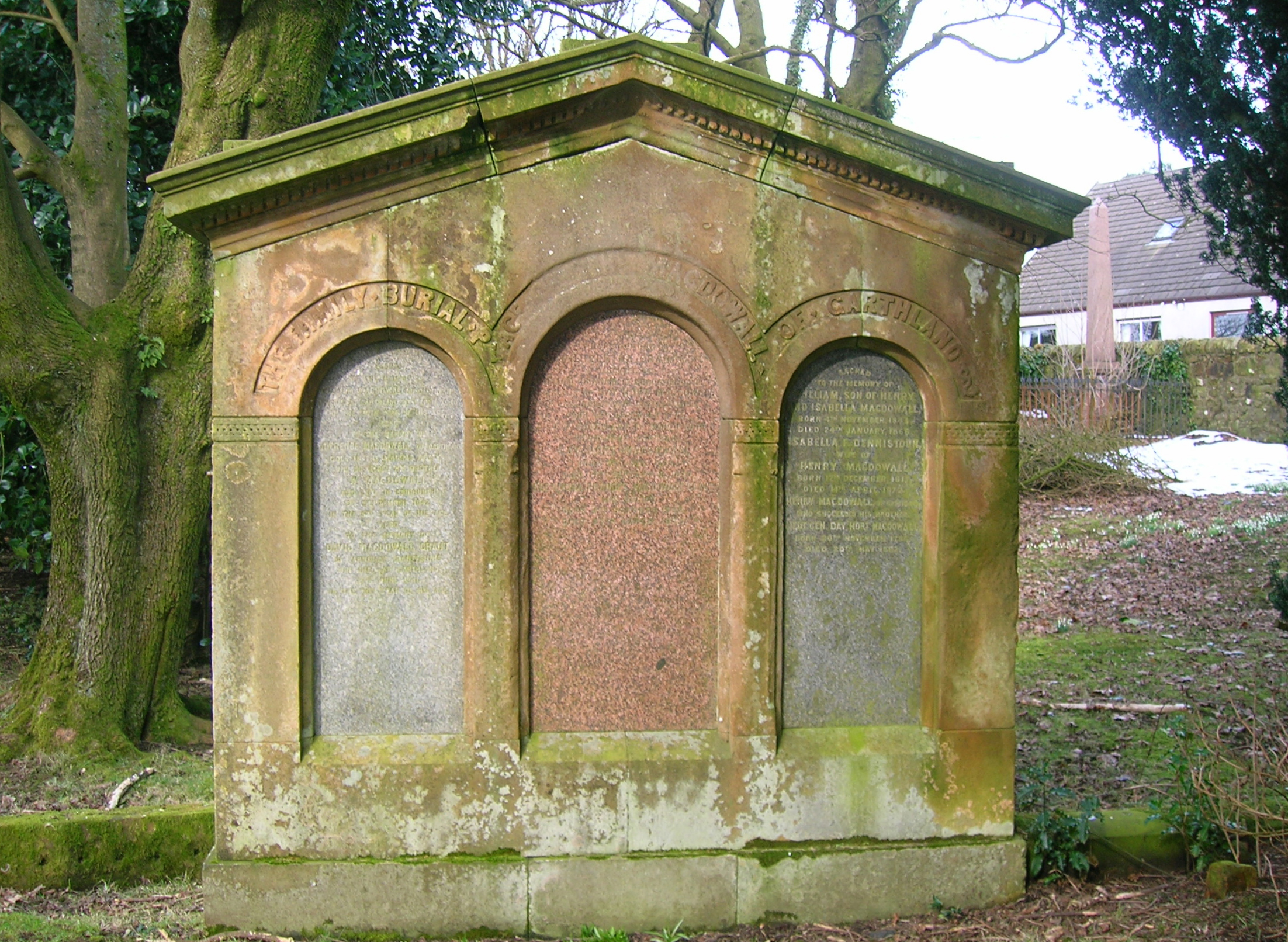
Memorial to the McDowalls of Garthland and Castle Semple.

The family have a number of recorded variations in their surname, including Sempill, Semphill, Sempil, Sempel and Semple. In about 1220 Robert Sempill, seneschal to the Barony of Renfrew, held 'Elziotstoun' from the high-steward of Scotland and sometime prior to 1309, a Robert Sempill of 'Elziotstoun' is recorded. Sir William Sempill in 1474 held the baronies of Elliston and Castleton, as did John, the first Lord Sempill in 1505. In 1513, John, the first Lord Sempill, was killed at the Battle of Flodden. In 1727 Hugh Sempill, 12th Lord Sempill, sold these lands to Colonel William McDowall of Garthland in whose family the lands remained until 1818, at which point John Harvey, Esquire, of Jamaica purchased the estate.

The Sempills of Elliston were Hereditary Sheriffs of Renfrewshire and also Hereditary Baillies of Paisley. The family's arms were Argent, a chevron chequy Gules and Argent between three hunting horns Sable stringed Gules.

==== Marjory Bruce ====
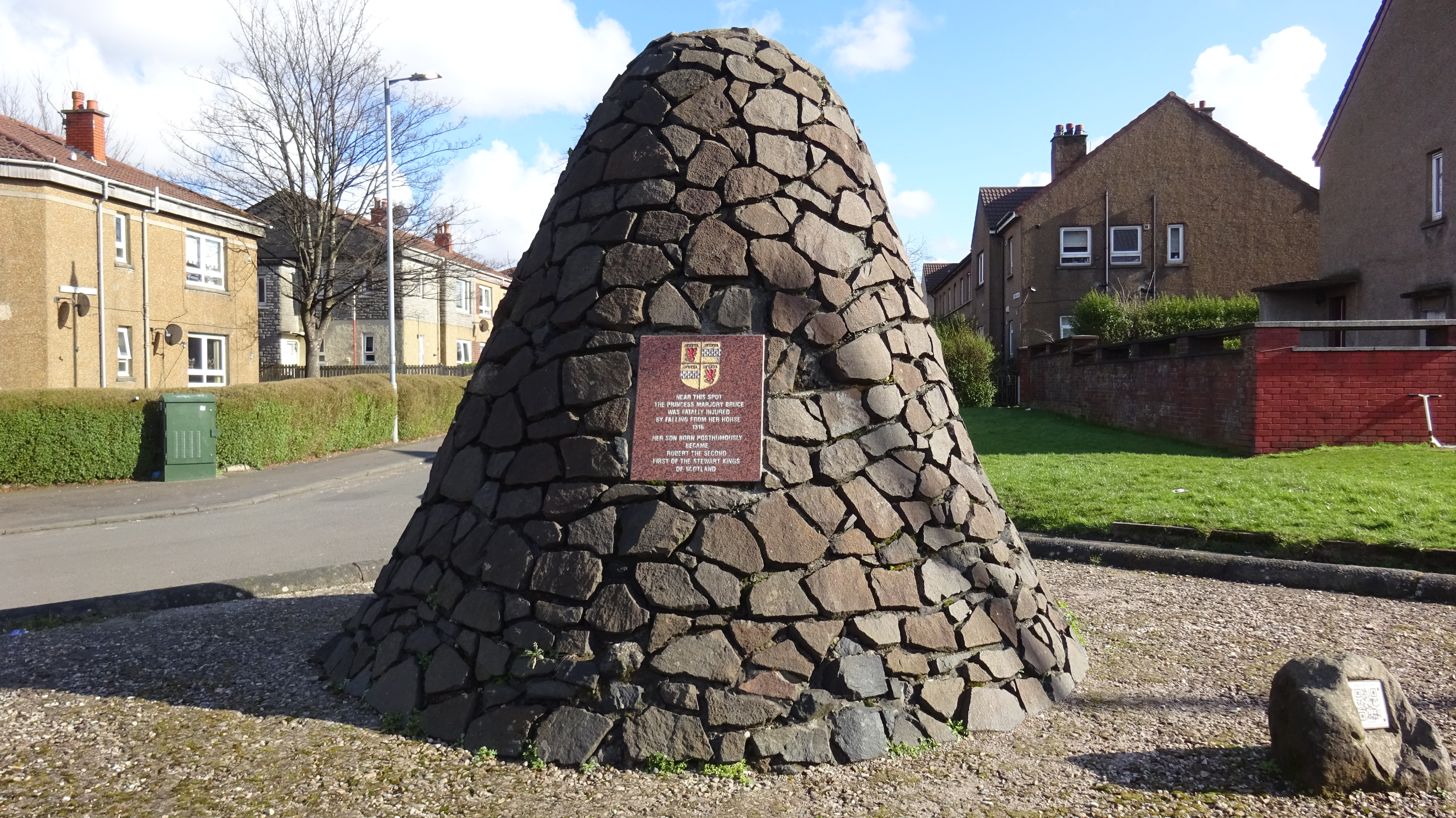
Marjory Bruce Memorial Cairn.

An interesting story is told of how the Sempill's came to hold the 'Lands of Sempill' that circa 1316 involves Marjory Bruce, daughter of Robert the Bruce and her son, Robert II : - "In this shire, at a part called the Knok, on Greiff near Ranfrow, was King Robert, called Blear-eye, cutted out of his mother's womb by Sir John Forrester of Elliestoun (who being hazarded on extremity to use that remedy to preserve the child's life, the Queen having there taken her child ill, being on the fields and dying, the child being quick in her belly) who before that was reputed a simple man – from whence the House of Sempill and Lords thereof have their name, and a part of their estate."

The Lands of Knock lie near Gallowhill between Paisley and Renfrew. A memorial cairn now stands on the spot where the heavily pregnant Princess Marjory, wife of Walter Stewart, 6th High Steward of Scotland, is said in some accounts to have fallen from her horse and broken her neck.

=== Elliston Castle ===
Arms of the Lord Sempill

Elliston Castle or tower was a late medieval tower house with an attached courtyard which was probably abandoned after the Sempills moved to Castle Semple, the new site previously being called Castleton, lying in the barony of that name. In 1735 the old castle was partly demolished. In 1905 the old castle is recorded as still standing, but in exceedingly ruinous condition. Further demolition took place in 1950 due to the dangerous condition of the castle.

Elliston Castle measured 42 ft by 33 ft, with end walls around 9 ft thick and side walls around 6 ft thick. Built before the regular use of cannon, gun-ports have been discovered in the walls. The walls were still 20 ft to 30 ft high in 1836, however by 1856 the north and south walls stood only stood at that height. Low courtyard walls of a rectangular shape were present in 1856. The castle's tower was rectangular, built with rough coursed masonry. A vaulted basement existed and in the thickened south-eastern wall a stairway and mural chamber may have existed. The end walls probably had opposing arched windows.

Elliston Bridge stands nearby, below the old Elliston Sawmill which was served by a leat with a sluice located at Linnister Farm on the Elliston Burn. Howwood Parish Church was once known as Elliston Chapel.

== Communications ==
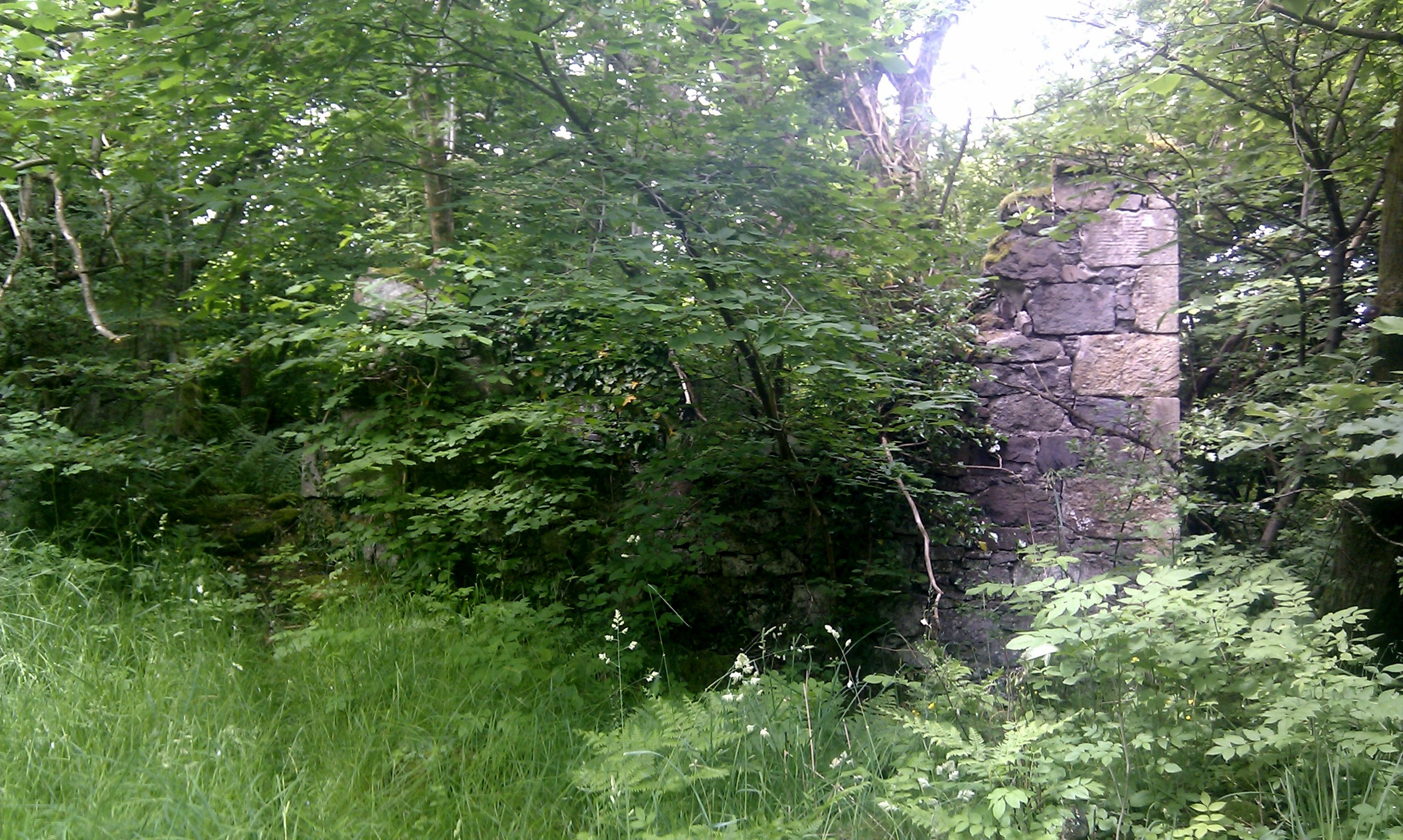
Ruins of Linnister Farm, latterly used as weaver's cottage.

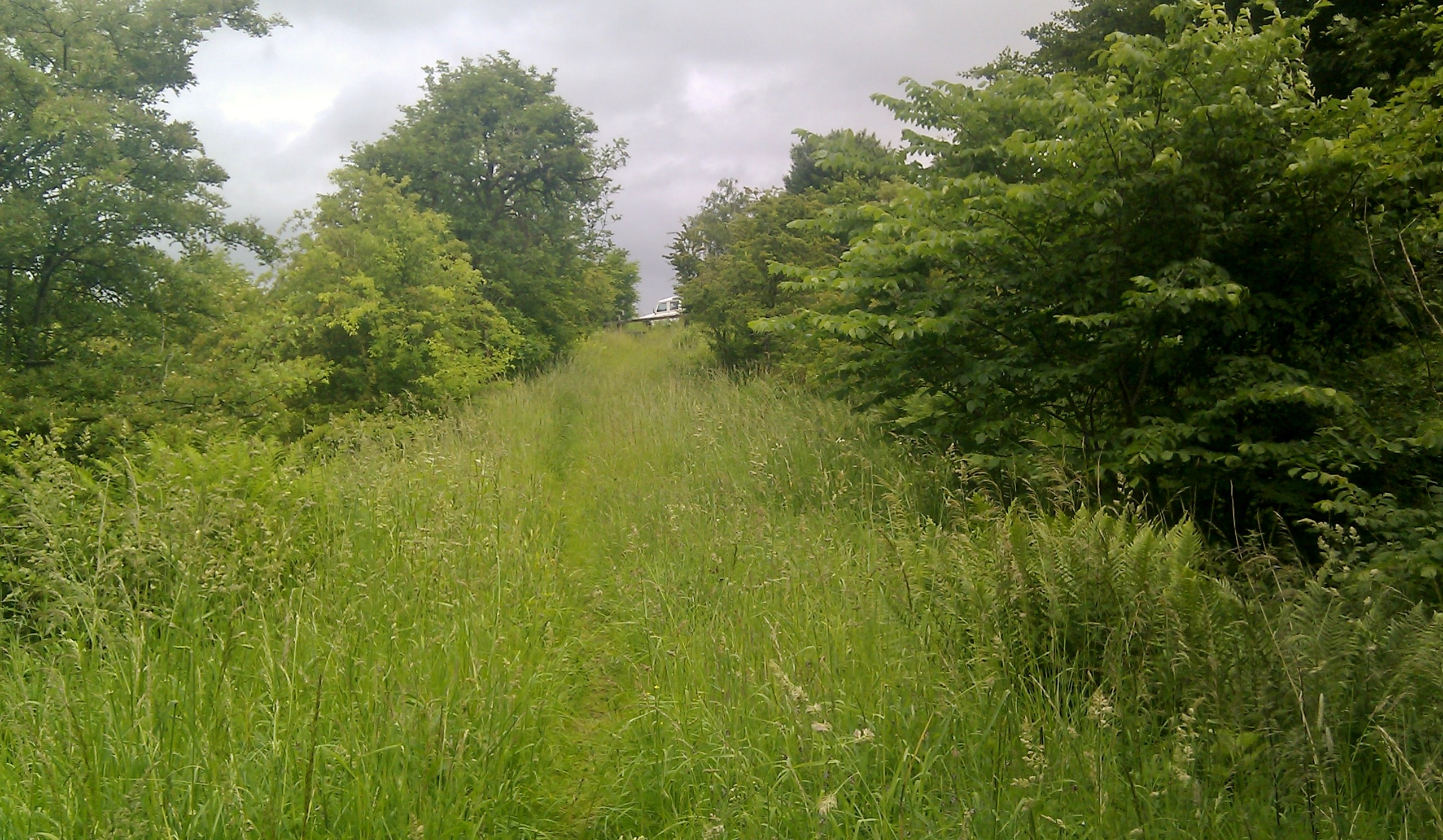
The old Paisley to Beith Road near the site of Linnister Farm.

The tower of Elliston guarded the important land route to the south at a time when no road existed closer to Lochwinnoch. This route was the Beith to Paisley Road as clearly marked on Roy's 1747 map that ran up from Beith, ran near Beltree farm passed Earlston Farm and the demolished Ward House through the Linnister Glen and the ruined Linnister Farm to cross the Elliston Burn. The old road continued up the valley side to run past the castle, then across the neighbouring fields before entering via Low Howwood along the remaining section of the road that then runs passed Glenfall House (Aitkins whinstone Quarry site), originally continuing on to George Street across land now built on; George Street has therefore become a cul-de-sac.

== Literature ==
The author Louise Turner has written a historical novel 'Fire and Sword' involving Sir John Sempill of Ellestoun, son of Sir Thomas, the Sheriff of Renfrew who died along with King James III at the Battle of Sauchieburn in 1488.

== House ==
In the United States, Eliestoun House was completed in 1890 by Alexander Wadsworth Longfellow Jr. The house is on the grounds of Principia College and named after "'Elliestoun Tower' on Castle Semple Loch". Henry Turner and his wife Ada Ames had the house built. Ada is a descendant of James Semple who is the founder of Elsah, Illinois.

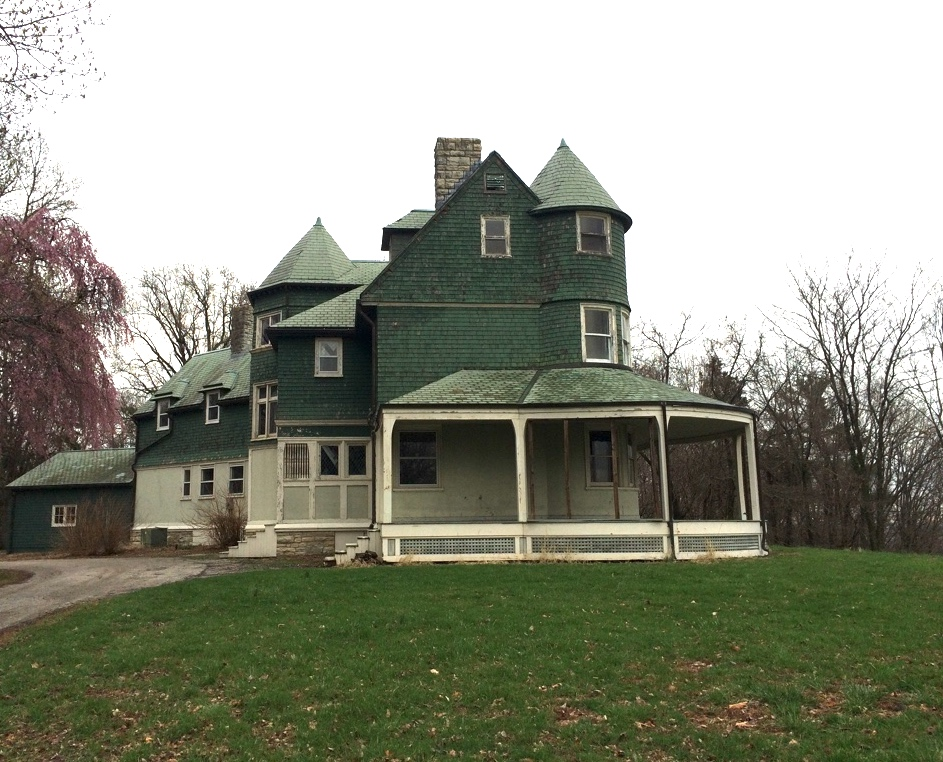
Eliestoun House was designed by Alexander Wadsworth Longfellow Jr. It was completed in 1890 and is on the Principia College campus. Photographed in 2014.

== See also ==
- Castle Semple Collegiate Church
- Clyde Muirshiel Regional Park
