= Robert Sempill, 3rd Lord Sempill =

Scottish lord of Parliament

Robert Sempill, 3rd Lord Sempill (c. 1505–1576) was a Scottish lord of Parliament.

Robert, also Semphill or Semple, 3rd Lord Sempill (d. circa 1575), commonly called the 'Great Lord Sempill', was the elder son of William Sempill, 2nd Lord Sempill, by his first wife, Lady Margaret Montgomery, eldest daughter of Hugh Montgomerie, 1st Earl of Eglinton. His parents' marriage was commemorated in carved stone heraldry at Castle Semple Collegiate Church. Through her paternal grandmother, Lady Margaret Montgomery was a fifth generation descendant from Robert II of Scotland. So descendants of Robert, 3rd Lord Sempill, are descended from many Scottish monarchs up to Robert II, and also from Anglo-Saxon kings (through the marriage of Malcolm III of Scotland to Saint Margaret of Scotland).

The Sempill family from the thirteenth century were hereditary bailiffs of the regality of Paisley and sheriffs of Renfrew under the Lord High Steward of Scotland. They frequently distinguished themselves in the English wars, and were employed in important duties of state. Sir Thomas Sempill, father of John Sempill, 1st Lord Sempill, was killed at the battle of Sauchieburn on 11 June 1488, fighting in support of James III, and the first Lord Sempill, created by James IV about 1489, fell at Flodden on 9 September 1513.

== Early career ==
Robert, as Master of Sempill, served in household of James V of Scotland wearing livery costume, and gave the King presents which were recorded because the King had them embellished by his craftsmen. In 1532 the King's armourer William Smithberde polished and sharpened the blades of eight two-handed swords given by Robert, other gifts were stockings and a tartan coat called a "galcot" in January 1533. On 20 October 1533, he was made Governor and Constable of the king's castle of Douglas. In April 1534, after Robert had reached his majority, James V exacted a financial penalty for his "non-entry" to the Sempill lands, punishing his father for non-payment.

Robert Sempill became Master of Household to Regent Arran. In July 1550, Robert Sempill was summoned for treason. David Stewart became Master of Household to Regent Arran in his place.

He succeeded his father as Lord Sempill in 1552.

== Murder ==
Robert, Lord Sempill, was said to have murdered William Crichton, 5th Lord Crichton of Sanquhar, on 11 June 1552. According to the story recorded by John Lesley, Lord Sempill was in the private lodging of Regent Arran in Edinburgh and was moved by rage to stab Lord Sanquhar with his sword. Sempill was arrested and taken to Edinburgh Castle and would have been beheaded, but his influential friends secured his release.

It was said by Robert Lindsay of Pitscottie that Sempill's daughter Grizzel, called 'Lady Gilton', who was the widow of James Hamilton of Stenhouse a former Provost of Edinburgh, was particularly helpful in securing help for Sempill. She was the mistress of John Hamilton, Archbishop of St Andrews, Regent Arran's brother. A record survives of a pardon granted in September 1552 to Lord Sempill's eldest son, Robert Master of Sempill, for his part in the murder.

For Lesley, the incident was an example of the troubles in Scotland during a period of factional rivalry between Regent Arran and Mary of Guise before she became Regent. Pitscottie tells the story as an example of corruption in Arran's regency.

== Religion and the sieges of Castle Semple ==
Robert, Lord Sempill, resisted the Scottish Reformation in 1560. Being a steadfast supporter of the queen regent against the Lords of the Congregation, he was described by Knox as "a man sold under sin, an enemy to God and to all godliness." The Lords of the West laid siege to Castle Semple in Lochwinnoch in December 1559. Leaving his son at Castle Semple, Lord Semple took refuge in the stronghold of Dunbar Castle, then under the command of a French captain, Corbeyran de Cardaillac Sarlabous. Sarlabous was asked in August 1560 to give him up but declined to do so until he received the command of Mary, Queen of Scots and Francis II of France. Thomas Randolph shortly afterwards reported that Sempill had conveyed himself secretly out of Dunbar, and had retired to his own castle with twenty arquebusiers lent him by Sarlabous, and then that he had gone to France.

After the Scottish Reformation Parliament, James Hamilton, Duke of Châtellerault and his son James Hamilton, 3rd Earl of Arran again besieged Castle Semple. An ally of the Hamiltons, the Earl of Glencairn gave a description of an assault on the castle on 18 September 1560 that penetrated the yard. The attackers took some sheep to prove their achievement:

"This last Wednesday the few hagbutters here came to Castle Sympill, and they within came forth to the yards in their accustomed manner, and they, more wilful than wise, came plain upon them and drove them out of the yards into the castle, while they (the defenders) shot little pistols at them out of the windows, and dared not come to the wall heads (parapet). And to verify this, they took sheep that they had within the close away with them. And never a man hurt or slain, but one who will heal, and diverse of the enemy evil hurt, as my brother has written to me."

Lord Sempill made his way to Dumbarton Castle but was captured on 14 October 1560. When Castle Semple was taken in November 1560, he was at Dunbar. He was 'relaxed from the horn' in March 1561. A royal cannon with the insignia of James V of Scotland, probably used at this siege, was recovered from Castle Semple Loch in the 19th century and is now in the collection of Glasgow Museums.

== Lord Sempill and Mary Queen of Scots ==
Sempill was one of the "nobles and barons of the west country" who on 5 Sept 1565 signed a band in support of Mary and Darnley, in opposition to the Earl of Moray and other rebels of the Chaseabout Raid, and in Mary's army held a command in the vanguard of the battle; Robert, 3rd Lord Sempill’s initial loyalty to Mary Queen of Scots was acknowledged:

“Pope Pius IV to John, Lord of Hume, William, Lord of Seton, John, Lord of Sempill…: The report which the Queen of Scotland's ambassador... has given of the steadfastness of... some... Scottish nobles in defence of the Catholic religion, as also of their loyalty to their Queen, is very gratifying to the Pope, who felicitates them on the renown they have won among men, and much more upon the reward they may expect from God. He exhorts them still to persevere, more especially as there is now no little hope of better things".

Though a Catholic, he joined the association for the 'defences of the young prince' after the murder of Darnley, in opposition to Bothwell and the queen.

At Carberry Hill on 14 June 1567, he commanded in the vanguard of the army that opposed the queen; and he was also one of those who signed the documents authorising William Douglas of Lochleven to take the queen under his charge in Lochleven Castle. In Morton's declaration regarding the discovery and custody of the 'casket letters', he is mentioned as having been present at the opening of the casket.

=== Marian Civil War ===
After the queen's escape from Lochleven, Sempill assembled his dependents against her at Langside on 13 May 1568. On the 19 May he was, with the Earl of Glencairn, appointed Lieutenant of the Western parts, with special instructions to watch Dumbarton Castle, and prevent the entrance into it of provisions or reinforcements or fugitives. For his special services he obtained a gift of the abbey of Paisley.

While returning one evening in May 1570 from the army that had demolished the castle of the Hamiltons, Sempill visited a house belonging to one of daughters, where he was captured by some of the Hamiltons' dependents, and carried a prisoner to Craignethan Castle, then known as "Draffen".He was afterwards taken to Argyle by Lord Boyd. Calderwood states that he remained in Argyle for twelve months, but he was probably set at liberty in February 1571; for when the house of Paisley surrendered to the regent at that time, the lives of those within it were granted on this condition. Notwithstanding the utmost efforts of Glencairn and Sempill, the castle of Dumbarton continued to hold out, until, on 1 April 1571, its rock was scaled by his cousin Thomas Crawford of Jordanhill.

== Family ==
Robert 3rd Lord Sempill married firstly, Isabel Hamilton, a sister of William Hamilton of Sanquhar, and secondly Elizabeth Carlyle, a daughter of Lord Torthorwald.

His children with his first wife Isabel Hamilton of Sanquhar, included four daughters and two sons:

- Robert Master of Sempill, who predeceased him, father of Robert Sempill, 4th Lord Sempill
- Andrew Sempill, ancestor of the Sempills of Burchell
- James Sempill. In August 1542 Andrew Sempill and his brother James Sempill, sons of Robert, Master of Sempill, were old enough to witness a property transaction made in Paisley.

Children with his second wife Elizabeth Carlyle, include

- John Sempill of Beltrees, who married Mary Livingston in March 1565. She was one of the Four Marys who were ladies in waiting to Mary, Queen of Scots.
- Colonel William Sempill of Lochwinnoch, who was involved in the Spanish blanks plot, is thought to have been a son of the 3rd Earl.
- Jean Sempill married James Ross, 4th Lord Ross.

Lord Sempill was still living on 29 March 1574, when Claud Hamilton brought an action against him, but died before 17 January 1576.

== Not the poet of that name ==
Neither the 3rd lord Sempill nor his son Robert, Master of Sempill, nor the 4th Lord Sempill could have been, as Sibbald, Motherwell, and others maintain, the Robert Sempill who was author of the Sempill Ballads, the 4th Lord was born too late, while in the case of the first two the early date of their death precludes the supposition.

== See also ==
- The Peel of Castle Semple

== Bibliography ==
- Sempill, Robert (d.1572) (DNB00)
- Calendar State Papers, Foreign Elizabeth
- Calendar State Papers Scotland
- Register Privy Council Scotland, vols. i.–ii
- Knox, John, History of the Reformation
- Calderwood, History of the Church of Scotland
- Douglas's Scottish Peerage (Wood), ii. 493–4
- Collections for the County of Renfrew, vol. ii. 1890.

Peerage of Scotland
Preceded by William Semple	Lord Sempill; 1548–c.1576	Succeeded by Robert Sempill
