= William Sempill, 2nd Lord Sempill =

Scottish lord (died 1552)

William Sempill, 2nd Lord Sempill (died 1552) was a Scottish lord and Sheriff of Renfrewshire.

== Early life ==
William was the son of John Sempill, 1st Lord Sempill and Margaret Colville, daughter of the Laird of Ochiltree. John was killed at Flodden in 1513, while William was still a minor and he was not made Lord Sempill until 1515.

== Feuding ==
When the Duke of Albany returned to Scotland as governor on 20 September 1523, he sent from Dumbarton Castle to Lord Sempill for oxen to pull the new guns brought from France.

Following his father, William continued a feud with the Earl of Glencairn and the Cunningham family. In September 1527, he and the Earl of Cassillis were declared traitors. In 1540, William had to pay the Lord High Treasurer of Scotland £66-13s-4d as the cost of a pardon or a remission for a crime committed by himself and his friends.

== Family ==
William's first wife, was Lady Margaret Montgomery, eldest daughter of Hugh Montgomerie, 1st Earl of Eglinton. Margaret Montgomery was descended from Robert II of Scotland through 5 generations. So descendants of this marriage are descended from many Scottish monarchs up to Robert II, and also from Anglo-Saxon kings (through the marriage of Malcolm III of Scotland to Saint Margaret of Scotland). The marriage was commemorated with carved stone heraldry at Castle Semple Collegiate Church. William's eldest son with Lady Margaret, Robert, Master of Sempill, served at the court of James V of Scotland along with his first cousin William, the son of Gabriel Sempill of Ladymure and Cathcart. In April 1534 Robert had reached his majority, and James V exacted a financial penalty for his "non-entry" to the Semple lands. Other children of this marriage include;

- David Sempill of Craiginfeoch
- Helen Sempill, married Allan, Lord Cathcart, who was killed at Pinkie.
- Marion Sempill, married Stirling of Keir.

Secondly, William married Elizabeth Arnot

Thirdly, William married Mariota or Marion Montgomery, daughter of John Montgomerie of Hessilhead. Marion Montgomery had previously been married to Crawfurd of Auchinarmes, her eldest son John Crawfurd was killed at the battle of Pinkie in 1547. After William Sempill's death, she married John Campbell of Skipnish, their daughter Jean was an ancestor of the Marquis of Bute.

Peerage of Scotland
Preceded by John Sempill	Lord Sempill; 1515–1547	Succeeded by Robert Sempill
