= William Sempill =

Scottish soldier and diplomat

Colonel William Sempill of Lochwinnoch
- Born: 1546; Lochwinnoch, Renfrewshire, Scotland
- Died: 1633 (aged 86–87) Madrid, Spain
- Allegiance: Dutch Republic ?-1582; Spain 1582-1633
- Known for: Service to the Spanish Crown;; association with Royal Scots College, Madrid
- Conflicts: Eighty Years' War; Siege of Lier
- Other work: diplomat, political agent

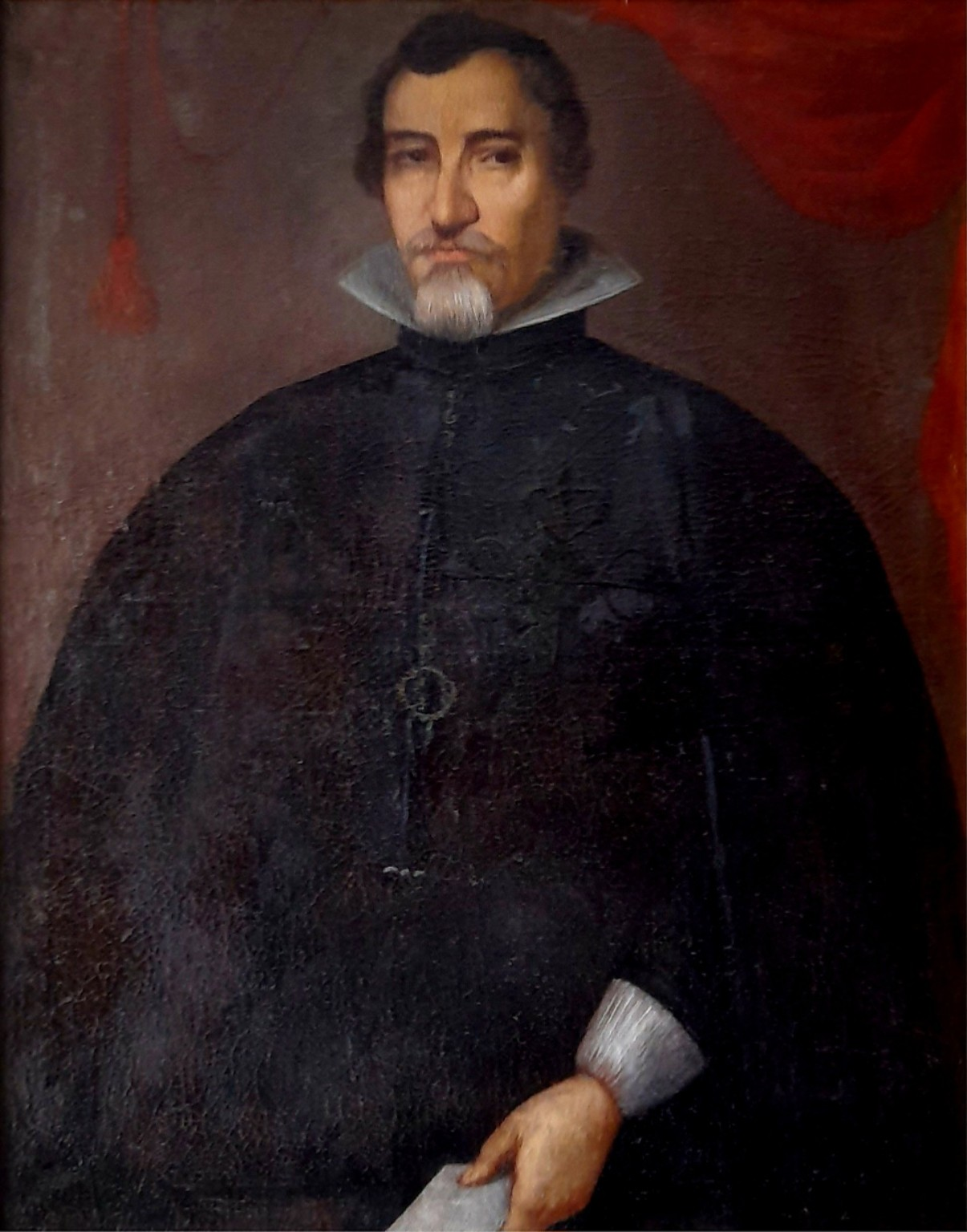
Portrait of Colonel William Sempill from Royal Scots College, Salamanca, Spain

Colonel William Sempill of Lochwinnoch (also Semple; 1546–1633) was a Scottish soldier, diplomat and political agent who spent much of his career in the service of the Spanish Crown. He is chiefly known for his role in the surrender of the fortified town of Lier to Spanish forces in 1582 during the Eighty Years' War, and later served as an adviser and intermediary under Kings Philip II of Spain, Philip III of Spain, and Philip IV of Spain.

== Early life ==
Sempill was born in 1546, probably at Lochwinnoch in Renfrewshire. He belonged to a cadet branch of the noble Clan Sempill family, although his precise parentage remains uncertain. Contemporary accounts variously described him as either an illegitimate son or a collateral relation of the Lords Sempill. Some historians have suggested that he was most likely an illegitimate son of Robert Sempill, 3rd Lord Sempill. Some later accounts state that he spent part of his youth at the court of Mary, Queen of Scots.

== Military career in the Low Countries ==
Following the upheaval in Scotland after the abdication of Mary, Queen of Scots, Sempill entered military service in the Low Countries, where many Scots served as mercenaries during the Dutch Revolt. He is recorded as having served under William the Silent in the armies of the rebel Dutch Republic. During this period, Scottish troops were active on both sides of the conflict, and a number of expatriate Scots became involved in the political and religious struggles of the Eighty Years' War.

By the early 1580s, Sempill had risen to command a company of Scottish soldiers stationed in the fortified town of Lier, near Antwerp.

=== Siege of Lier ===
In 1582, Lier was considered one of the principal defensive positions protecting Brabant and the approaches to Antwerp. The town formed part of the rebel defensive network in the southern Netherlands during the continuing war against Spain.

In August 1582, Sempill entered into secret negotiations with the forces of Alexander Farnese, Duke of Parma, commander of the Spanish Army of Flanders. According to contemporary accounts, Sempill used his position within the garrison to facilitate Spanish entry into the town and assisted in organising the surrender of Lier with limited resistance.

The fall of Lier was regarded as a significant strategic success for Farnese and formed part of the wider Spanish recovery of territory in the southern Netherlands during the 1580s. The capture strengthened Spanish control in Brabant and improved communications between loyalist strongholds in the region.

Contemporary Protestant sources condemned Sempill's actions as treachery, while Spanish authorities regarded his conduct as an important service to the Crown. His role in the surrender subsequently brought him favour with the Spanish monarchy and contributed to his later appointment in royal service in Spain.

== Service to Spain ==
After the capture of Lier, Sempill travelled to Spain and entered royal service under Philip II of Spain. He subsequently acted as an intermediary between the Spanish monarchy and Catholic interests in Scotland during the later reign of Elizabeth I of England. According to Concepción Sáenz-Cambra, Sempill developed extensive contacts within Scottish Catholic and exile networks and became involved in Spanish intelligence and diplomatic efforts directed against England and the Dutch Republic.

During the 1580s and 1590s, Sempill was employed in missions connected to Spanish policy in Britain and Ireland. In 1588, during preparations for the Spanish Armada, Philip II reportedly dispatched Sempill to Scotland in an attempt to encourage James VI to support Spanish operations against England. He was later captured and imprisoned for alleged involvement in conspiratorial activity before escaping custody.

Sempill also maintained connections with leading Catholic figures in Ireland during the Nine Years' War. Secretly, Sempill had met with Hugh O'Neill, Earl of Tyrone, Sorley Boy MacDonnell and Rory O'Donnell, 1st Earl of Tyrconnell, leaders of the Irish discontents. William also gave 100 gold Ducats to Hugh O'Neil and Rory O'Donnell on behalf of Spanish authorities.

By the 1590s, Sempill was advocating a more aggressive naval strategy against England and the Dutch Republic. Modern historians have described some of his proposals as anticipating maritime policies later pursued under the government of the Count-Duke of Olivares. Sáenz-Cambra describes him as an early proponent of coordinated naval warfare designed to weaken English commerce and communications.

== Royal Scots College ==
Sempill has been associated with the foundation of the Royal Scots College in Madrid in 1627, an institution established for the education of Scottish Catholic clergy in exile. The college occupied property reportedly granted to Sempill in settlement of unpaid royal wages, which he then made available for the institution.

== Later life and death ==
Sempill remained in Spain for the rest of his life. He held the ceremonial household office of gentilhombre de la boca (gentleman of the mouth), an appointment within the royal household. He continued to support Scottish Catholic missions abroad and remained active at court into old age. He died in Madrid in 1633, aged about 87.

== Legacy ==
Sempill is regarded as an example of the Scottish military diaspora in early modern Europe. His career illustrates the role played by expatriate Scots in continental warfare, diplomacy and Catholic exile networks during the sixteenth and seventeenth centuries.
