= John Sempill of Beltrees =

John Sempill
- Born: circa 1540; England
- Died: 1579 (aged 38-39); Scotland
- Known for: Member of the court of Mary, Queen of Scots
- Spouse: Mary Livingston (m. 1565–1579)
- Children: James, Arthur, John, and Dorothy
- Parent(s): Robert Sempill, 3rd Lord Sempill; Elizabeth Carlyle

John Sempill (c. 1540–1579) was a Scottish courtier and husband of Mary Livingston, one of the Four Maries who grew up with Mary, Queen of Scots.

== Career ==
John Sempill was a son of Robert Sempill, 3rd Lord Sempill and Elizabeth Carlyle.

Lord Sempill was banished from Scotland and France in 1540 and found refuge not far from the Scottish-English border in Carlisle, England. Although Robert had a wife and several sons and daughters, he took Elizabeth as his mistress and had a son and two daughters by her. The eldest of these was John.

She was from the House of Torthorwald in Dumfries, Scotland but the family, as one can guess from the name, stemmed from Carlisle. Her father was Robert Carlisle of Pettinain in Lanarkshire, a son of John Carlisle, 1st Lord Carlyle of Torthorwald and Janet Maxwell. Lord Carlisle, Elizabeth's grandfather, had obtained the lands of Pettinain in 1471 as reward for his part in the battle of Arkinholm.

With the death of James V, Robert's exile was at an end and he returned to Scotland leaving his mistress and their three children in Carlisle. Robert had to ask Thomas Wharton, an agent to Henry VIII, to forward his request of permission to remove his children from England to the Privy Council and was granted immediately.

== At the Scottish court ==
John and his two sisters joined their father in Scotland. Elizabeth, too, moved to Scotland if not with the children certainly before 24 Aug 1546 as that date marked the legitimization the births of their children.

It is unclear how long John remained at Castle Sempill as he was sent to the household of Mary of Guise at a tender age. He was also in the service of the Queen of Scots while she was in France and that opportunity was likely linked to Marie de Guise, who traveled to France in October 1550 along with several Scottish lords, returning through a year later through England.

With the Lords of the Congregation launching an attack on Castle Semple, Robert took his son John, now nearing full age in October 1560, and traveled to France to link up with Robert's cousin german, Thomas Crawfurd. Robert and Thomas were not merely relatives but also comrades in arms having both fought at the Battle of Pinkie and both taken prisoner by the English. Thomas, after his release by the English, traveled to France and was employed as a Gens d'Arme appointed to guard and attend his son Francis and daughter-in-law, Mary, Queen of Scots. Mary arrived about the same time, Aug 1548, accompanied by her guardian, Lord Livingston, and four girls her age of noble birth to be her friends and Maids of Honor and all four named Mary. One of these was Lord Livingstone's daughter and it was this maid, Mary Livingston, nicknamed 'Lusty', who caught the eye of young John Sempill, leading eventually to marriage. They had probably met initially during the year he visited with Marie de Guise but their 'tander ages' precluded any romantic notions.

After their arrival in October, events moved quickly . . . in November, King Francis took ill, by 5 December, he was dead. By March, Robert had been relaxed from the horn and he and John returned to Scotland, probably with his cousin Thomas Crawfurd, the Queen, and 'Lusty.'

The Scottish Reformation was in full sway and their leader John Knox did not have much good to say about the Queen or her retinue. John was castigated by Knox as "Sempill the dancer." When the marriage of John and Mary Livingston was announced, Knox spread the rumour that they had to marry as Mary was with child, a blatant falsehood.

Queen Mary threw a lavish wedding for John and Mary that lasted three days. The Queen was lavish too in her gifts including an ornate bed, jewels, and the lands of Auchtermuchty. John's grandfather William, the second Lord Sempill, had obtained a charter of the five-pound lands of Beltrees from Mary of Guise, dated October 1545. These lands previously belonged to a family of the name of Stewart. William Stewart and Alison Kennedy had a charter of them from King James III in 1477. This family failed in the person of another William Stewart of Beltrees in 1599. Beltrees, in the parish of Lochwinnoch, Renfrewshire, became the patrimony of John Sempill. John was now known as John Sempill of Beltrees. The lands of Thirdpart were included in the contract but title would remain with his uncle William until his death and eventually passed to his son Francis.

As a married woman, Mary Livingston was no longer a maid of honour. She remained a court favorite and continued in the Queen's retinue as a Lady-in-waiting and Keeper of the Queen's jewels and furs. John and Mary were at the Palace of Holyroodhouse when David Rizzio was murdered in the Queen's chamber. Immediately after the murder, the Queen asked Mary Livingston to request that her husband remove a box containing her foreign correspondence and cypher keys from David Riccio's chamber then under the guard of John's father, Robert. The couple were also with Queen Mary at Lochleven and John helped Queen Mary escape.

== Sempill and the Marian Civil War ==
John Sempill remained loyal to Queen Mary, although his father, Lord Sempill, was on the vanguard of the Protestant forces at the battle of Langside in spite of remaining a Catholic. With Queen Mary's flight to England, and the Marian Civil War, he was not in the best of positions politically.

In November 1570, Regent Lennox demanded jewels that had belonged to the Queen to be turned over to him and ordered John Sempill to be imprisoned in Blackness Castle. Mary, Queen of Scots, asked John Lesley, Bishop of Ross, to complain to Elizabeth I. In 1573, Regent Morton wanted English assistance in the siege of Edinburgh castle, he directed several sons of Lords, including John, be sent to Queen Elizabeth as hostages for the good conduct of the Scots to assure the safe return of Sir William Drury, his army, and cannon. John, ever faithful to the Marian cause, was not a willing participant.

== Sempill and Regent Morton ==
Robert, Lord Sempill died between Feb 1574 and 17 Jan 1576 and the heritable title of Sheriff would eventually go to his grandson Robert who was only six or so years of age at that time. Instead, John became Sheriff. This did nothing to shield him from the vengeful Regent Morton.

"In the beginning of the year 1577, a circumstance occurred which the Regent eagerly seized upon as a fit opportunity for again oppressing the Hamilton family. Queen Mary, previously to her retreat into England, had bestowed upon Mary Livingston, one of her maids of honour, a certain portion of land. This lady had married John Sempill of Beltrees, and Morton, to one of whose estates the property lay contiguous, resolved to reduce the deed of gift, and convert it to his own use.

The business was accordingly brought before the Court of Session, where Morton urged that the gift was null and void, as the Crown lands could not be alienated. Beltrees answered "That it was a plain deed of gift, under the Great and Privy Seal, and therefore could not be recalled." The plaintiff, however, was both party and judge, for he sat in person to browbeat the judges; and the defender, Sempill, seeing his plea likely to be lost, in a great rage openly protested that if he lost his suit he should lose his life too. His uncle, Whitefuird of Milntoune, fell into the same violent passion, and alluding to Morton's low stature, said that "Nero was but a dwarf compared to Mortoun". These and other intemperate expressions uttered out of Court, gave the Regent a handle, and proceedings were instituted against both uncle and nephew. Beltrees was taken in to Edinburgh, but Milnetoun absconding was apprehended at Bute. A report was industriously spread by the creatures of the government, that these two persons had been hired by Lord Claud Hamilton to murder the Regent, and the torture was, to make them criminate that nobleman. Beltrees, naturally weak and timorous, sunk under the first application of the Boot, and confessed everything they wished; but Milnetoun, a man of a more determined spirit, resolutely bore all their torments with unshaken constancy, and asserted his own and Lord Claud's innocence. He was shortly afterwards discharged; but such cried and arbitrary proceedings excited the highest indignation, and made Morton's government be universally detested."

John Sempill of Beltrees was found guilty of "treasonable conspiracy of Lord Regentis Graceis slauchtare" on 15 June 1577. Morton had tried to recover for the crown a piece of land which Queen Mary had given to Sempill and Mary Livingston in reward for their "gude service". Morton was also the legal tutor or guardian of the Sempill lordship, two reasons why Sempill might hold a grudge against him. It was alleged that Sempill and Adam Whiteford of Milnton plotted to shoot Morton with an arquebus on Edinburgh's High Street. Sempill confessed to this after torture with the boot. He was however reprieved.

John Sempill died on 25 Apr 1579. This appears from his latter-will, which was recorded 19 Feb 1582, "The Testament Dative and Inventar of the gudis, geir, sowmes of money and dettis pertening to umquhile JOHNE Sympill of Beltrees, within the Sherifdome of Renfrew, the tyme of his deceis, quha deceist vpon the xxv day of August lxxix zeiris, faithfullie maid and gevin vp be Marie Levingstoun his relict [spous] in name and behalf of Arthour, Johne and Dorathie Sympillis, lauchfull bairnis to the Defunct." No mention is here made of James Sempill, the eldest son; but this may be accounted for from the fact of his being otherwise provided for.

== Bibliography ==
- Acts of Parliament, "Peerage of Scotland: A Genealogical and Historical Account of all the Peers of that Ancient Kingdom; their Descents, collateral Branches, Births, Marriages, and Issue.", London: J Almon, 1767, Vol. II
- Anderson, William, "The Scottish Nation; or. The surnames, families, literature, honours, and biographical history of the people of Scotland", Edinburgh: A. Fullerton & Co., 1867, Vol. III
- Crawfurd, George, "A General Description of the Shire of Renfrew: Including an Account of the Noble and Ancient Families ... To which is Added, a Genealogical History of the Royal House of Stewart, and of the Several Noble and Illustrious Families of that Name, from the Year 1034 to the Year 1710", Paisley: J.Neilson, 1818
- CSP Vol II, "Calendar State Papers Relating to Scotland and Mary, Queen of Scots", Edinburgh: H.M. General Register House, 1900, Vol. II
- CSP Vol III, "Calendar State Papers Relating to Scotland and Mary, Queen of Scots", Edinburgh: H.M. General Register House, 1903, Vol. III
- CSP Vol. IV," Calendar State Papers Relating to Scotland and Mary, Queen of Scots", Edinburgh: H.M. General Register House, 1905, Vol. IV
- Grant, Francis James, "Commissariot Record of Edinburgh, Register of Testaments, Part I. Volumes 1 to 35 1514-1600", Edinburgh: James Skinner & Co., 1897, Part I
- Hogg, James Robert, "Sempills of Beltrees," Hogg's Weekly Instructor, Vol. III New Series, (1849): pp. 374–7
- Laing, David, ed., The Works of John Knox: History of the Reformation, Edinburgh: Bannatyne Club,1848, Vol. 2
- MacKenzie, Robert Dunbar."Kilbarchan; a parish history", Kilbarchan: Alexander Gardner,1902
- Metcalfe, William Musham, "A History of the County of Renfrew from the Earliest Times", Renfrewshire: A. Gardner, 1905
- Paterson, James, "History of the Counties of Ayr and Wigton", Edinburgh: James Stillie, 1864, Vol. II
- Paterson, James, "History of the Counties of Ayr and Wigton", Edinburgh: James Stillie, 1866, Vol. III Part 2
- Paterson, James, "The Poems of the Sempills of Beltrees: Now First Collected", Edinburgh: Thomas George Stevenson) 1849
- Paul, James Balfour. "The Scots Peerage : founded on Wood's ed. of Sir Robert Douglas's Peerage of Scotland; containing an historical and genealogical account of the nobility of that kingdom", Edinburgh: David Douglas,1908, Vol. V
- Paul, James Balfour. "The Scots Peerage : founded on Wood's ed. of Sir Robert Douglas's Peerage of Scotland; containing an historical and genealogical account of the nobility of that kingdom", Edinburgh: David Douglas,1910, Vol. VII
- Pitcairn, Robert, "Ancient Criminal Trials in Scotland", Edinburgh: William Tait, 1833, Vol I
- Robertson, Joseph, "Inventaires de la Royne Descosse Douairiere de France - Catalogues of the Jewels, Dresses, Furniture, Books, and Paintings of Mary Queen of Scots 1556-1569", Edinburgh: Bannatyne Club, 1863
- Semple, William Alexander, "Genealogical history of the family Semple from 1214 to 1888", Hartford, CT: Press of Case, Lockwood, and Brainerd Company, 1888
- Semple, William Alexander, "History of the Lairds of Glenfield, etc", Paisley: Paisley Herald, 1860
- Stodart, Robert Riddle, "Scottish Arms being a Collection of Armorial Bearings A.D. 1370-1678", Edinburgh: William Paterson, 1881, Vol. II
- Strickland, Agnes, "Lives Of The Queens Of Scotland And English Princesses", New York, Harper & Brothers, 1852, Vol. IV
- Strickland, Agnes. "Mary Livingston", Englishwoman's Domestic Magazine, London: S. O. Beeton,1862, Volume V, Issue 25
- Thomson, Thomas. "The historie and life of King James the Sext: being an account of the affairs of Scotland, from the year 1566, to the year 1596; with a short continuation to the year 1617", Edinburgh: Bannatyne Club,1825
