= James Sempill =

Scottish courtier and diplomat

Sir James Sempill (1566–1626) was a Scottish courtier and diplomat. He was known by the name of his family estate, Beltrees or Beltries.

== Early life ==
James Sempill was the eldest son of John Sempill of Beltrees, and Mary Livingston, one of the "Four Marys", companions of Mary, Queen of Scots.

Sempill was brought up with James VI under George Buchanan at Stirling Castle in the royal household supervised by Annabell Murray, Countess of Mar. He completed his education at the University of St. Andrews, and used the title "Mr." or Master on account of his degree.

Sempill assisted James VI in the preparation of his Basilikon Doron in 1599, and may have taken the text with him to England. He was on good terms with the Kirk minister Andrew Melville, and caused a furore by showing Melville the contents of Basilikon Doron in advance. Via James Melville the text reached the synod of Fife. Sempill later supported Andrew Melville in 1606 when he was committed to the Tower of London. Robert Boyd of Trochrig considered Sempill an enemy of the bishops.

== Scottish diplomat ==
Sempill was Ambassador to England in the years 1591-1600 and was knighted on Christmas Day 1600. Another Scot employed by the King in London, James Hudson, referred to Sempill's youth and inexperience in March 1599. Hudson wrote that Sempill was "a raw piece to employ and one unskilful, only a scholar". The mission concerned the Valentine Thomas affair and the rebel Earl of Bothwell.

Roger Aston, an English courtier of James VI, wrote in August 1599 that "Beltries was plain and honest, and by the means of Sir George Elphinstone (of Blythswood) whose sister he married, he may do good offices." Hudson wrote again to Sir Robert Cecil, the English Secretary of State in September 1599, praising Sempill's good nature, and mentioning that his paternal grandmother was English. Hudson added that Sempill would be "the true Lord Sempill if he had his due." Sempill sent newsletters to Cecil, and in English correspondence he was known by the cipher "99".

In August 1599, James Sempill was sent to London to take the place of David Foulis and collect the "gratuity" for James VI, a sum of money which Elizabeth I of England sent to Scotland to support James VI. He delivered £400 sterling of this money to George Heriot for jewels given as New Year's Day gifts. A Scottish servant of Lady Kildare named Dicksoun ingratiated himself with Sempill, and said she had spoken in favour of the king's succession to the English throne at dinner with the Lord Admiral.

He seems to have carried letters from Anthony Bacon and the Earl of Essex to Lord Willoughby in January 1600. He obtained £3000 as subsidy for King James. On his return to Scotland, in April 1600, Anne of Denmark asked him what Elizabeth had said about her, and she disbelieved him at first, based on the reports of others. A joke was made about young Prince Henry's involvement in diplomacy. Sempill was privy to correspondence between Anne of Denmark and Albert VII, Archduke of Austria.

In December 1600, James gave him £100 sterling from the English subsidy to cover his previous expenses as a diplomat in England. Sempill became involved in the discussions following the kidnap of Edmund Ashfield by English agent at Leith. In 1601 he was sent to France, and accompanied the Duke of Lennox from Dieppe to London in October.

In November 1601 the Earl of Northampton wrote to the Earl of Mar that in London the king's agent James Hamilton stirred up Frances Howard, Countess of Kildare, the Duke of Lennox, and Sempill, who 'like an organ, sowndes when the other blowes'.

Back in Scotland, in April 1602 Anne of Denmark asked him to mention her in a letter to Robert Cecil. She told Sempill that Sir Thomas Erskine of Gogar had been the author of slanders against her which were current in France and England. Erskine kept the King busy writing to England, and she wished she knew what these letters were about, and would have intercepted them if she could. She had had an offer from a courtier to destroy the career of the Earl of Mar if she undermined the Duke of Lennox, which she knew how to do, and understandably wanted Sempill to keep this secret. Sempill hoped Cecil would cut off this part of the letter and burn it. Sempill wrote to Cecil again in May 1602. Marie Stewart, Countess of Mar had written to her brother the Duke of Lennox complaining he was the Earl of Mar's main opponent in Scotland. Sir Thomas Erskine was blamed for their trouble, and slanders against the Duke in France and England.

On 3 February 1603 James gave him a jewel which had belonged to Mary, Queen of Scots for his good service abroad and at home, and faithful conduct of diplomatic negotiations. The jewel was a carcatt (necklace chain) with a diamond in one piece and a ruby in another, with a tablet (locket) set with a carbuncle of a diamond and ruby, set around with diamonds.

James Sempill of Beltrees died at Paisley in 1626.

== Works ==
He wrote some theological works:

- Cassander Scotiana to Cassander Anglicanus (1616);
- Sacrilege sacredly handled (1619), written against Joseph Justus Scaliger and John Selden;
- Sacrilege saved by Cassander (1619);
- An Answer to Tilenus' Defence of the Bishops and the Five Articles (1622). This was written against Daniel Tilenus at the suggestion of Andrew Melville.

He is now chiefly remembered for the poem The Packmans Pater Noster, a vigorous attack on the Roman Catholic Church. An edition was published at Edinburgh in 1669 entitled A Pick-tooth for the Pope, or the Packmans Pater Noster, translated out of Dutch by S. I. S., and newly augmented and enlarged by his son R. S. (reprinted by Paterson). Seven poems, chiefly of an amorous character, are printed in T. G. Stevenson's edition of The Sempill Ballates.

== Family ==
His wife was Egidia or Geillis Elphinstone, daughter of George Elphinstone (the elder) of Blythswood and Marion Scot. They had two sons, Robert Sempill the younger and George (who died young), and five daughters, of whom Marion was married to Colin Campbell of Ardkinglas, and Margaret to Walter Macfarlane of Macfarlane.
