= Walls Loch =

Coordinates: 55°47′51.9″N 4°32′14.5″W

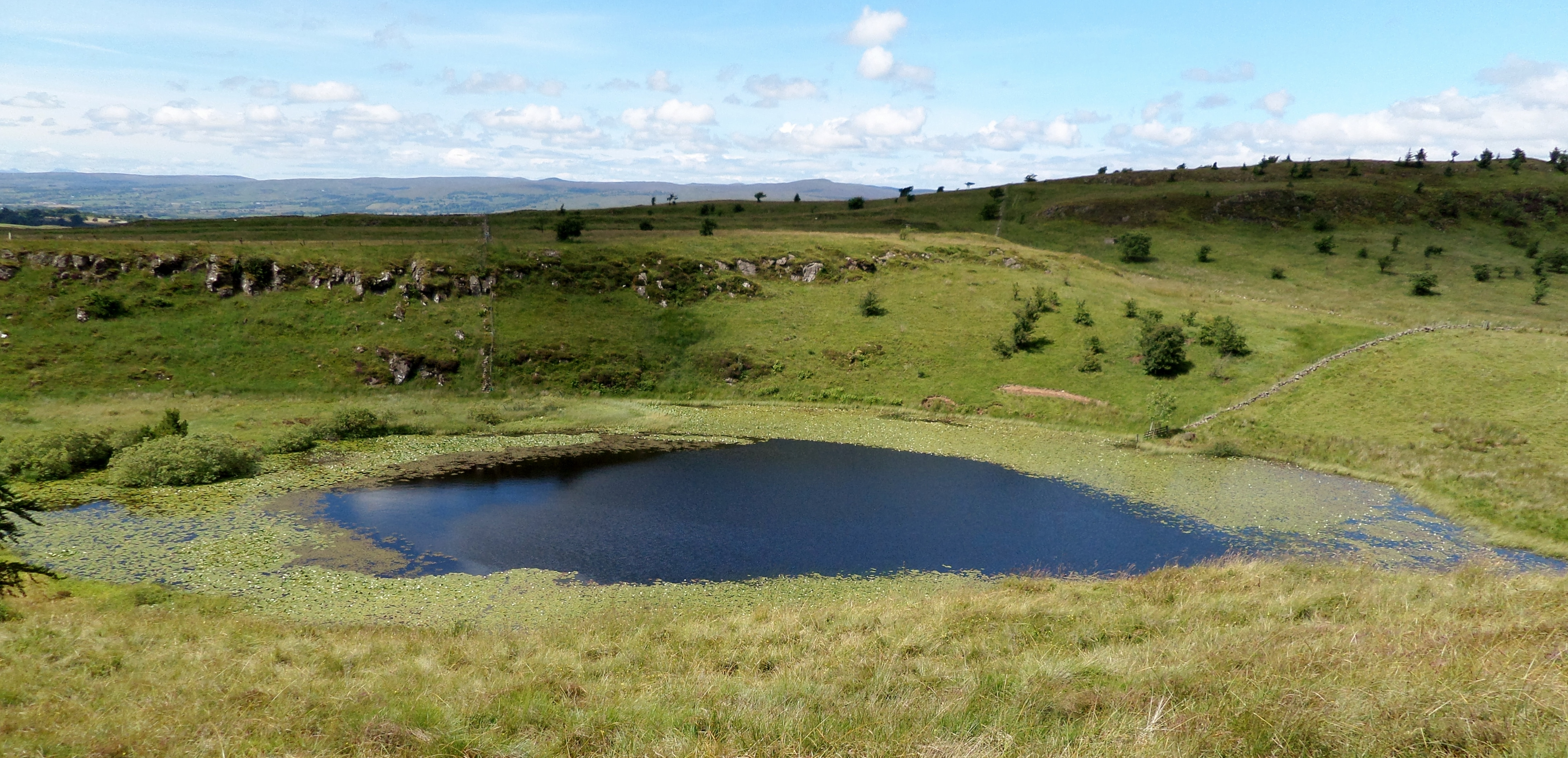
- Walls Loch as seen from the Walls Hill Iron Age Hillfort

- Location of Walls Loch, Renfrewshire
- Location: Howwood, Renfrewshire, Scotland
- Type: Freshwater loch
- Primary inflows: Rainwater and surface drainage
- Primary outflows: Muirhead Burn
- Catchment area: Whittliemuir
- Basin countries: Scotland
- Max. length: 2,860 ft (870 m)
- Max. width: 1,980 ft (600 m)
- Islands: None
- Settlements: Lochwinnoch

Walls Loch is situated at a height of 560 feet, below the Walls Hill Iron Age fort and to the east of Broadfield Hill on the lands of North Castlewalls Farm, Whittliemuir, Howwood, Renfrewshire, Scotland.

The loch is a natural feature, sitting in a hollow to the west of Walls Hill and close to the old North Castlewalls Farm. The loch waters drain via the Muirhead Burn that flows into Barcraigs Reservoir close to Auchenbathie Tower. Its dimensions are a length of 2860 feet or 872 metres and a width of 1980 feet or 604 metres.

== History ==
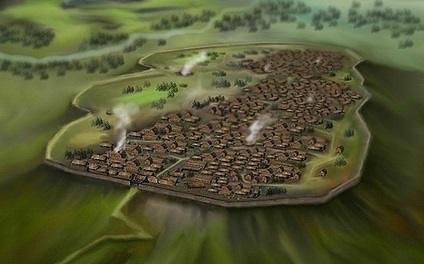
Celtic Oppidum, Central Europe 1st century BC

Walls Hill is the site of an Iron Age hillfort, the largest in Renfrewshire and probably an oppidum of the celtic Damnonii tribe, speculation suggests that the name 'Vanduara' may be associated with Walls Hill.

== Walls Loch ==
In 1960 a flint barbed and tanged arrowhead was found on the shore of Walls Loch, a type typical of the Bronze Age 'Beaker People' and the introduction of metal working to the British Isles.

One phase of occupation of walls Hill probably ended with the arrival of the Romans and then another circa the fourth and eleventh centuries before Walls Farm was built in the 14th century and then abandoned. Each phase of occupation would have impacted on the loch as a source of water for humans and domestic animals, fish etc as food, rushes and reeds for household use, etc. Whittliemuir pollen diagrams from the Iron Age show that a basic economy based on mixed farming existed in the area around the loch.

The 19th century OS maps indicate a small oblong enclosure below Walls Hill on the west bank of the loch that contained trees. A 'Fox Covert' is one possibility, created in order to encourage foxes to breed for the purposes of fox hunting.

Walls Loch is clearly marked near to Walls Farm circa 1747. In 1800 a 'Loch' is shown on Ainslie's map of Renfrewshire with an East Castlewalls Farm nearby. The 1857 OS map shows the loch near to a North Castlewalls Farm, the name having changed from 'East'.

== Place name evidence ==
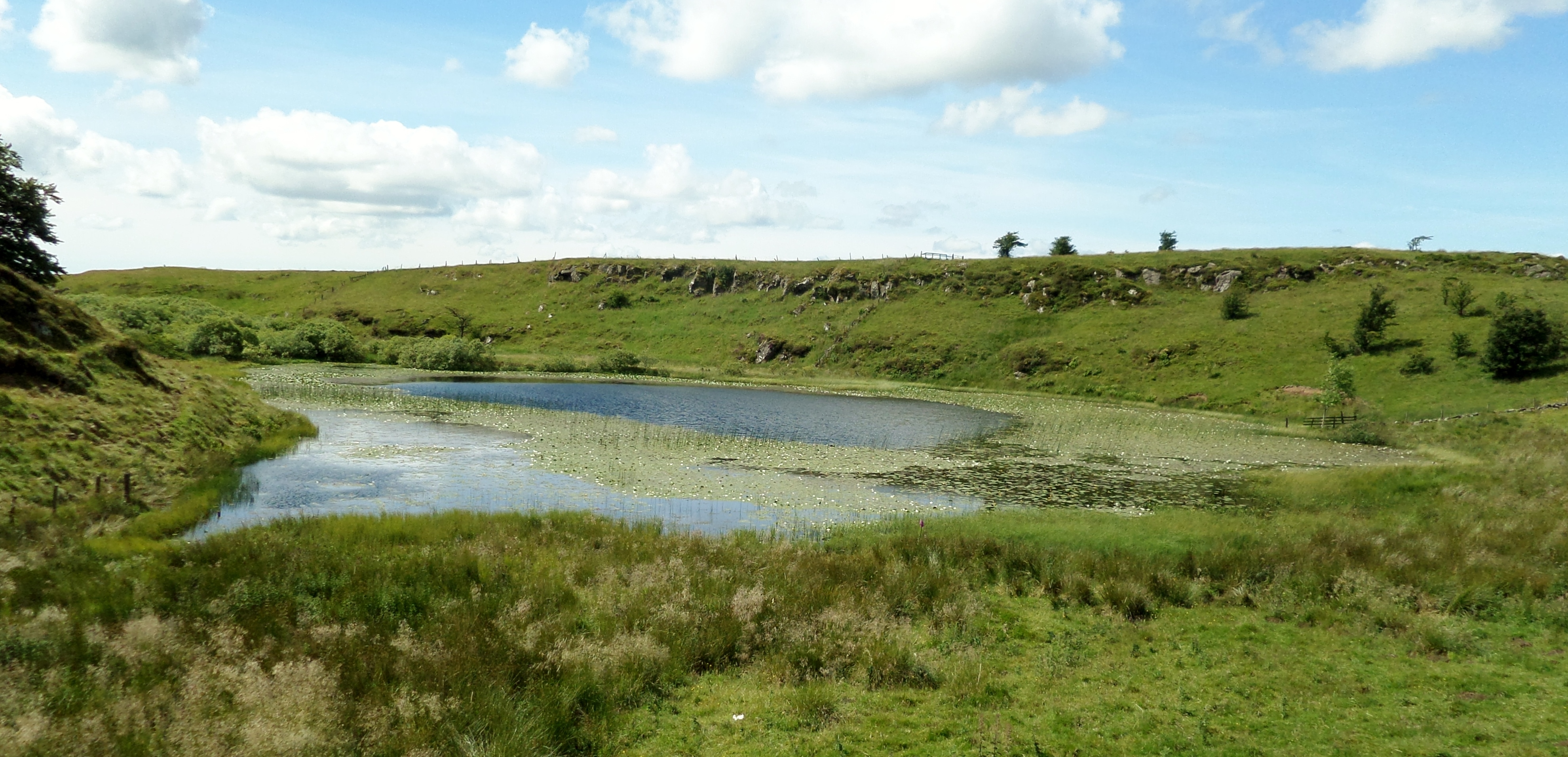
Walls Loch from near North Castlewalls Farm.

Names such as North and South Castlewalls are to be found on the maps of the area and these confirm the existence of a castle on Walls Hill.

== Battle of Muirdykes ==
On 18 June 1685 the Battle of Muirdykes was fought near to Walls Loch on Muirdykes Farm between the Duke of Argyle's men and those of James VII, the latter were defeated.

== See also ==
- Kilbirnie Loch - a nearby loch site
