= Siege of Lier (1582) =

Siege during the eighty years war

- Part of the Eighty Years' War
Date	1–2 August 1582
Location	Lier (present-day Belgium) 51°8′N 4°34′E
Result	Spanish victory

Belligerents
(Dutch Republic) States-General	Spain

Commanders and leaders
(Dutch Republic) William Semple (AWOL)	(Spain) Alexander Farnese

The siege of Lier of 1582, also known as the capture of Lier or betrayal of Lier, took place between 1 and 2 August 1582 at Lier, near Antwerp (present-day in the Belgian province of Antwerp, Flemish Region, Belgium), during the Eighty Years' War. On 2 August the Spanish army commanded by Governor-General Don Alexander Farnese, Prince of Parma (Spanish: Alejandro Farnesio), supported by part of the States garrison (a discontent group of Scottish troops led by Captain William Semple), captured and seized the town, defeating the rest of the Dutch, English and German troops under Governor of Lier. The entire garrison was killed or captured. The news of the Spanish victory at Lier was a shock to the States-General at Antwerp, where the sense of insecurity was obvious, and many of the Protestant citizens sold their houses and fled to northern Flanders.

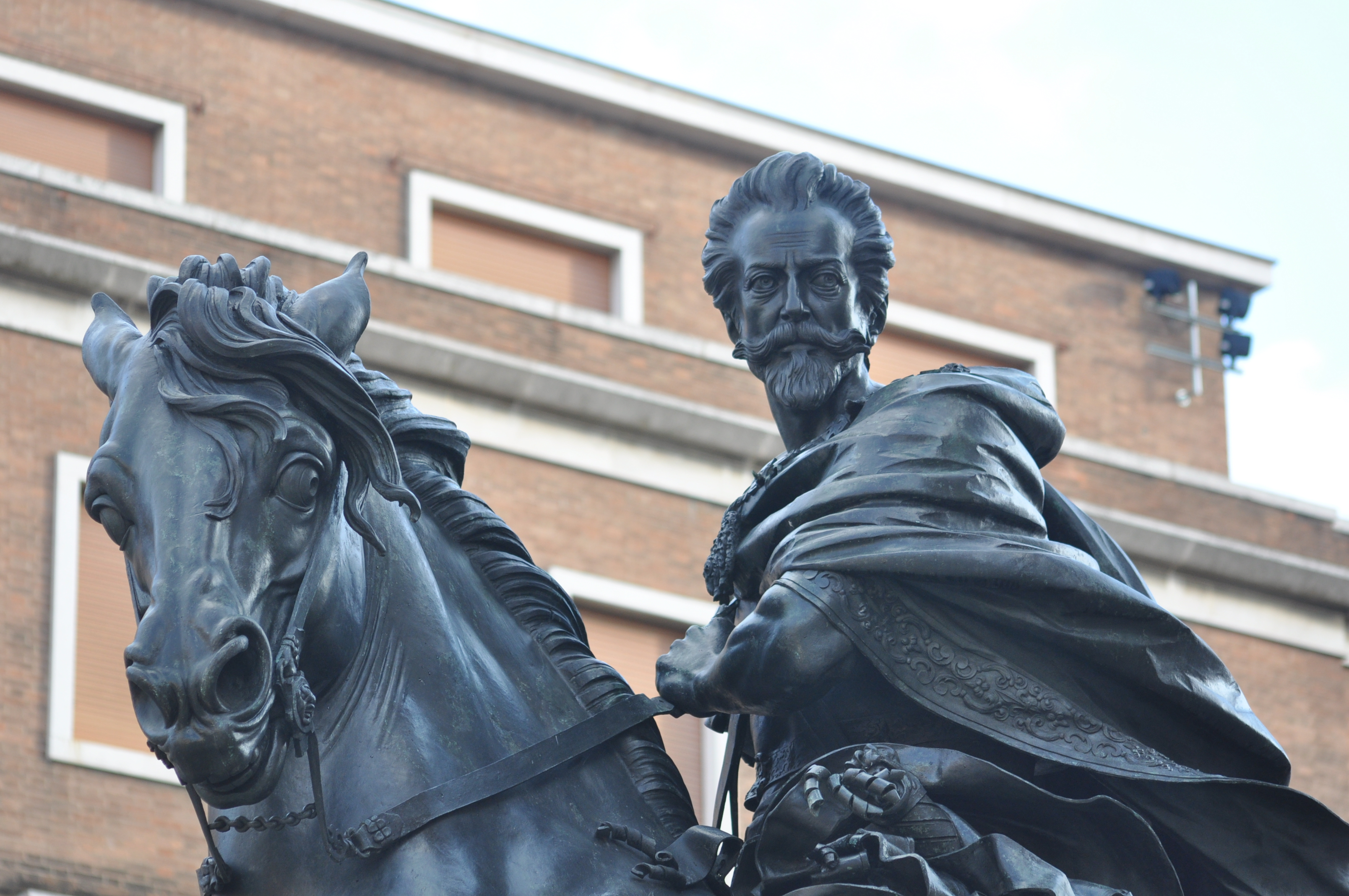
Equestrian statue of Don Alexander Farnese by Francesco Mochi.

The consequences of Semple's action were considerable because Liere was a strategic position, regarded as "the bulwark of Antwerp and the key of the Duchy of Brabant". The betrayal of Bruges in the following year by Colonel Boyd was probably prompted by his countryman's example. After a short visit to Prince Alexander Farnese at Namur, Semple was sent to Spain with a strong recommendation to King Philip II of Spain, who according to the Italian Jesuit Famiano Strada, handsomely rewarded him.

The next Spanish success was on 17 November, when the Spaniards led by Johann Baptista von Taxis (Spanish: Juan Baptista de Taxis) captured Steenwijk (taken by Dutch States forces on 23 February 1581) forcing the Protestant troops to surrender.

== See also ==
- Siege of Eindhoven (1583)
- Fall of Antwerp
- States-General of the Netherlands
- List of governors of the Spanish Netherlands
