= Mary Livingston =

16th-century Scottish noblewoman

- Born: 1541; Scotland
- Died: 1582 (aged 38–39); Scotland
- Known for: Lady in waiting to Mary, Queen of Scots
- Spouse: John Sempill of Beltrees (m. 1565–1579)
- Children: James Sempill
- Parent(s): Alexander Livingston, 5th Lord Livingston; Agnes Douglas

Mary Livingston (c. 1541–1589) was a Scottish noblewoman and childhood companion of Mary, Queen of Scots, one of the famous "Four Marys".

== Life ==
Mary Livingston was born around 1541, the daughter of Alexander Livingston, 5th Lord Livingston (c. 1500–1553), and his second wife Agnes Douglas, a daughter of John Douglas, 2nd Earl of Morton.

As a child, she and three other girls of similar age and standing, were chosen by the queen's mother, Mary of Guise, to become one of Queen Mary's ladies-in-waiting. The other three "Marys" were Mary Fleming, Mary Seton and Mary Beaton. Her younger sister Magdalen Livingston was a maid of honour to Mary, Queen of Scots.

=== A wedding at Queen Mary's court ===
In March 1565, Mary Livingston married John Sempill of Beltrees, a son of Robert Sempill, 3rd Lord Sempill (c. 1505–1576), who had been born in England.

Queen Mary may have given her a present of rubies set in gold for her collar and sleeves. The queen certainly gave her cloth and silver thread for embroidering a gown, a doublet, sleeves, and a skirt, and a bed made from scarlet and black velvet, with embroidered taffeta curtains and silk fringes.

The marriage was celebrated at Court during the Shrove-Tide feast on 5 March, called "Fasterins Eve" in Scotland, and there was a Masque, for which a painter was paid £12 for making props. The diplomat Thomas Randolph called it the "great marriage of this happie Englishman that shall marrie lustie Livingston." Randolph heard of a plan to invite the Earl of Bedford who was Governor of Berwick-upon-Tweed to the wedding because Sempill's mother was English. The Earl of Bedford had not previously visited Edinburgh.

The leading preacher of the Scottish Reformation, John Knox, disapproved of Queen Mary's court, and included some remarks on the marriage in his History of the Reformation in Scotland. According to Knox, Sempill was called the "Dancer", and Livingston was known as "Lusty" and pregnant before their wedding. Knox disapproved of grants of lands made by Queen Mary to the couple in 1565 including the barony of Auchtermuchty, rather than given to hard-working administrators. The 19th-century writer Agnes Strickland researched the marriage, noting that it was delayed rather than "shame-hastened" as Knox suggested, and had been discussed in autumn 1564.

=== Furs and jewels ===
In May 1566 when Queen Mary was pregnant she made inventories of her jewels and wrote who should have them if she died in childbed. Mary Livingston helped her and signed one document as "Marie Leviston".

After Mary, Queen of Scots went to England in 1568, Livingston retained some of her jewels. She sent them with Robert Melville of Murdocairny to her at Bolton Castle. Her husband, John Sempill, was charged by Regent Lennox to return some of the queen's jewels and furs of "martrick" and sable in his wife's keeping, but refused and was imprisoned in Blackness Castle. This fur may have been a zibellino, as several were recorded in Mary's inventories. In October 1573, Robert Melville was questioned about any jewels still in her keeping.

Livingston outlived her husband, and as a widow in January 1582 brought a legal action against Robert, Lord Sempill, over the possession of some lands. She received her pension, an "annalrent," in 1589.

== Family ==
Her children included:

- Sir James Sempill (1566–1625/1626), Scottish Ambassador to England from 1591 to 1600.

== In popular culture ==
In the 2013-2017 CW television series Reign, the character Lady Kenna, played by Caitlin Stacey is based on Mary Livingston.

In the 2018 film Mary Queen of Scots, Mary Livingston is played by actress Liah O'Prey.
