= Hugh Sempill, 12th Lord Sempill =

Scottish soldier

Brigadier-General The Right Honourable The Lord Sempill
- Born: The Hon Hugh Sempill; 1688
- Died: 25 November 1746 (aged 57–58) Aberdeen, Scotland

Hugh Sempill, 12th Lord Sempill (after 16 May 1688 – 25 November 1746) was a Scottish officer in the British Army.

== Life ==
He was the fifth son of Francis Abercromby, Lord Glasford by his wife Anne Sempill, 9th Lady Sempill, daughter of Robert Sempill, 7th Lord Sempill.

He went early into the Army, and was adjutant to Colonel Preston's Regiment of Foot 1 December 1708, ensign in the same regiment July 1709, and served at the Battle of Malplaquet. He was promoted captain 12 July 1712 and was placed on half-pay in 1713. In 1715 he was appointed captain in Brigadier-General Grant's Regiment, and promoted major on 5 April 1718.

On 17 February 1727 Hugh Sempill succeeded his brother John as Lord Sempill. That year he sold the estates of Elliotstoun and Castle Sempill, purchasing the estate of North Barr in 1741.

Sempill was made lieutenant-colonel of the 19th Regiment of Foot on 12 July 1731, and succeeded the Earl of Crawford as colonel of the Black Watch on 14 January 1741. He was in command when the regiment mutinied in 1743, and followed them that year to Flanders, where they highly distinguished themselves. He received allowances to enable the officers belonging to the corps to provide themselves with baggage horses upon their going to Flanders. He commanded in the town of Aeth when it was besieged by the French, and that regiment made a gallant defence.

Appointed colonel of the 25th Regiment of Foot on 9 April 1745, Sempill was promoted brigadier-general 9 June 1745. At the Battle of Culloden on 16 April 1746 he commanded the left wing of the royal army. In the middle of August following he arrived at Aberdeen and assumed the command of the troops stationed in that quarter. He died there on 25 November 1746. His remains were interred in the Drum Aisle in the West Church of that city on 1 December following.

== Family ==
Lord Sempill was married on 13 May 1718 to Sarah, daughter of Nathaniel Gaskell of Manchester. They had five sons, including John Sempill, 13th Lord Sempill, and six daughters, the eldest of whom, Sarah, married Patrick Crauford MP. Lady Sempill died on 17 April 1749.

== Notes ==
Attribution

Peerage of Scotland
Preceded by John Sempill	Lord Sempill; 1727–1746	Succeeded by John Sempill
