= Robert Sempill, 4th Lord Sempill =

Scottish Lord of Parliament

Robert Sempill, 4th Lord Sempill, (d.1611), Scottish Lord of Parliament.

Robert Sempill succeeded his grandfather as Lord Sempill in 1576, his father, Robert Sempill, Master of Sempill, having died in 1569. The 4th Lord Sempill's mother was Barbara Preston, daughter of the laird of Valleyfield near Dunfermline. At first, as a minor, Robert's estates were managed by Regent Morton, who served as his 'Tutor' according to Scots law. After Morton's execution, Robert Sempill's affairs were managed by curators, including Robert Mure of Caldwell who married his mother.

== Career ==
Robert 4th Lord Sempill served as a Privy Councillor to James VI of Scotland.

In 1587 he had legal difficulties with Annabell Murray, Countess of Mar. He was supposed to deliver to her the harvest of corn from Inchinnan by a certain day or be imprisoned in Dumbarton Castle. For some reason he couldn't deliver the corn, so he went to Dumbarton Castle. The Captain of Dumbarton had no warrant to accept as a prisoner, and it was too late to come to Edinburgh to the Privy Castle. The Countess alleged he was guilty of "wilful disobedience" and obtained letters ordering John Lord Hamilton to seize Sempill's properties. The Privy Council rejected Sempill's offers and defence in favour of arguments presented for the Countess by William Murray, the varlet of the King's Chamber.

Colonel William Sempill of Lochwinnoch, who was involved in the Spanish blanks plot and other Hispano-Scottish activities was probably Robert Sempill's half-brother, and in August 1592 Lord Sempill was commanded to surrender Colonel Sempill for questioning.

Between 1595 and 1599, Robert was sending intelligence of a Spanish invasion scare either against England or Scotland, an invasion which never came. On 12 December 1595 he wrote to the Earl of Essex from Rouen, with this uncertain but "constant bruit", saying that he would come to London and kiss Queen Elizabeth and the Earl's hands. In 1596 he was sent as ambassador to Spain. In May 1599, James VI discussed the Spanish invasion scare with the English ambassador William Bowes, based on Sempill's information.

In 1597 Sempill and others captured an English ship, the Jonathan of London and extorted money from its master James Upgrave.

In 1602 Sempill was dealing with Charles Emmanuel I, Duke of Savoy over a possible marriage for the Scottish Prince Henry.

== Family ==
Robert married firstly, Anne Montgomerie, daughter of Hugh Montgomerie, 3rd Earl of Eglinton. Anne or Agnes Montgomerie, was descended from James I of Scotland and Edward III of England on her father's side. Her mother, Agnes Drummond of Innerpeffray, was a daughter of Margaret Stewart, illegitimate daughter of James IV of Scotland. A portrait of Robert, 4th Lord Sempill can be seen in a new Sempill history. Their children were:

1. Hugh Sempill, 5th Lord Sempill; married Elizabeth Hay, daughter of Francis Hay, 9th Earl of Erroll.
2. Ann, married Archibald Stewart of Castlemilk
3. Barbara, married Colin Lamomt of Lasmont.
4. Grizzel, married John Logan of Raiss.
5. a fourth daughter, married Robert Bisbrane of Bishopton.

Robert married secondly, Joanna Everard from Ireland. Their son was:

1. William Sempill of Letterkenny (in Ireland).

Peerage of Scotland
Preceded by Robert Semple	Lord Sempill; 1576–1611	Succeeded by Hugh Sempill
