= Howwood =

Village in Renfrewshire, Scotland

Coordinates: 55.809°N 4.558°W

Howwood: Scottish Gaelic: Coille an Dail; Scots: The Howewuid
- Location within Renfrewshire
- Population: 1,600 (2020)
- OS grid reference: NS397602
- Council area: Renfrewshire
- Lieutenancy area: Renfrewshire
- Country: Scotland
- Sovereign state: United Kingdom
- Post town: JOHNSTONE
- Postcode district: PA9
- Dialling code: 01505
- Police: Scotland
- Fire: Scottish
- Ambulance: Scottish
- UK Parliament: Paisley and Renfrewshire South
- Scottish Parliament: Renfrewshire South

Howwood (Scots: The Howewuid, Scottish Gaelic: Coille an Dail) is a village in Renfrewshire, Scotland. It is between Johnstone and Lochwinnoch, just off the A737 dual carriageway between the nearby town of Paisley and the Ayrshire border. It is served by Howwood railway station.

== History ==
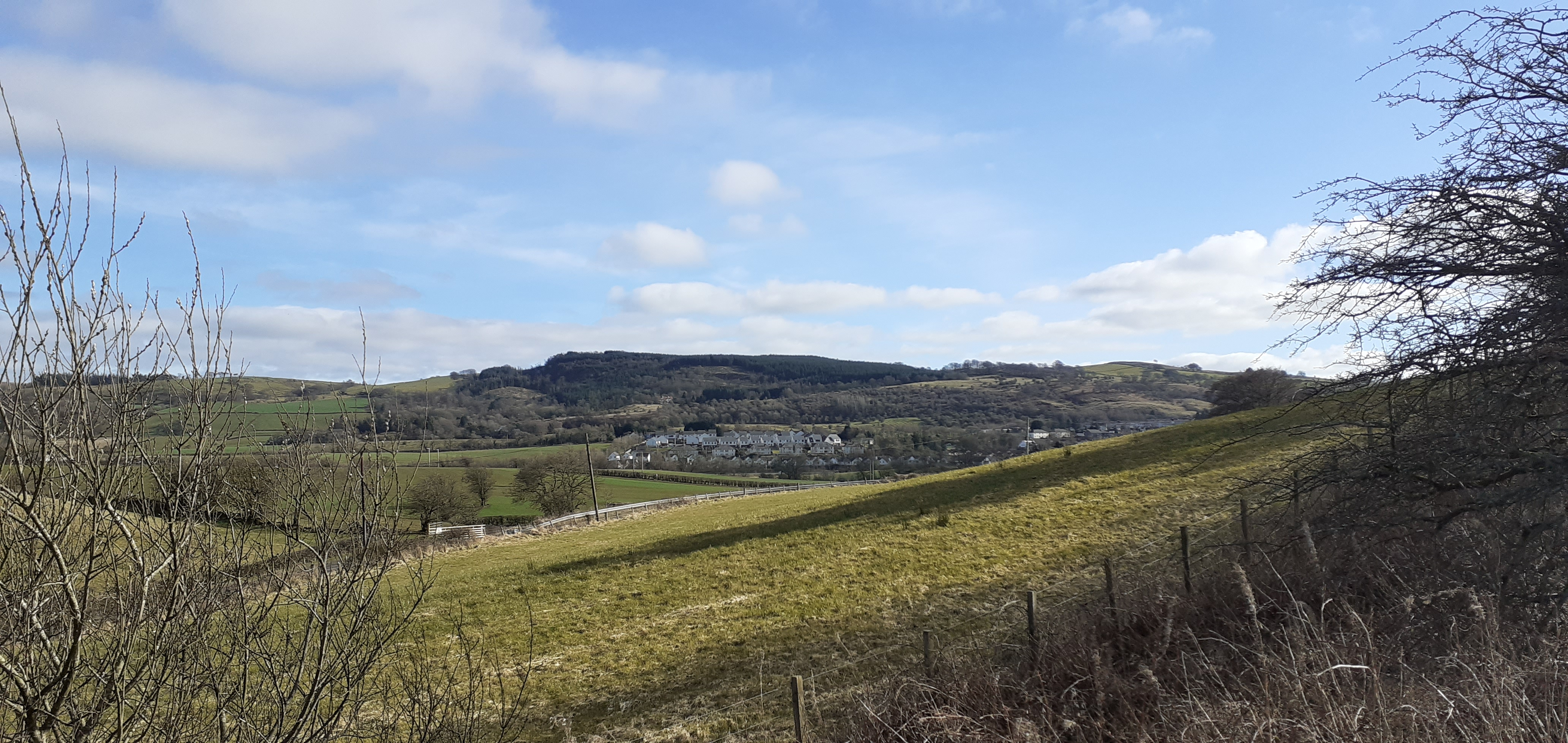
Howwood seen from a nearby bike trail

Its name is listed in the late 19th century Ordnance Gazetteer of Scotland as "Howwood or Hollow-wood". Hollow-Wood is an anglicisation of the Scots language name Howewuid. The Surname Database gives the following etymology for the equivalent surname 'Howood': a topographical name from residence by a muddy wood, deriving from the pre-7th-Century Old English "horh", mud, slime, and "wudu", wood.

Historically part of the civil parish of Lochwinnoch, it now supports its own Community Council.

The chief industry in the village was formerly bleaching and the finishing of cotton cloth and thread, particularly from the mills of Paisley and the other Renfrewshire villages. Two main bleaching works existed at Bowfield and Midtownfield, the former being the last to close in the 1960s.

Overlooking the village on Kenmure Hill is the Temple, a circular folly built around 1760 and whose purpose is unknown. In the hills above Howwood also lie the remains of Elliston Castle, a tower house once home to the Semple family. A battle took place between Government forces and Covenanters at Muirdykes on the 18 June 1685, led by the Cochrane family of Johnstone The Iron Age hillfort of Walls Hill lies on Whittliemuir with the Walls Loch lying to the west of it.

== Transport ==
Stagecoach South Scotland runs services to Adrossan or Glasgow. McGill’s run services to Johnstone, Paisley and Lochwinnoch.
