= Castle Semple Church =

Church building in Renfrewshire, Scotland

Coordinates: 55.8069°N 4.5935°W

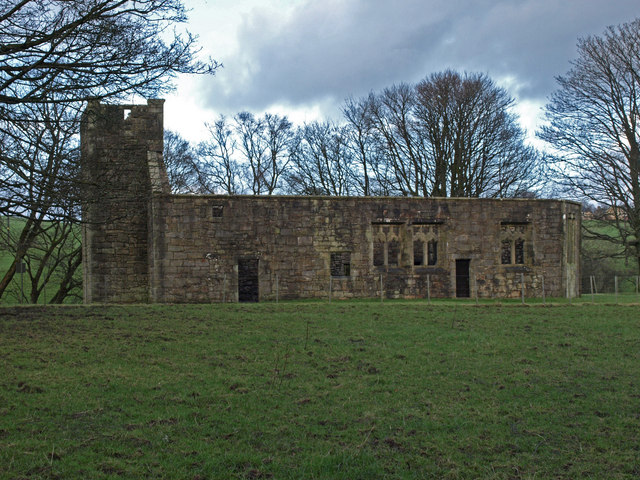
Castle Semple Collegiate Church, on the southern shore of Castle Semple Loch.

Castle Semple Collegiate Church is located in Renfrewshire, Scotland. It is situated near the eastern end of Castle Semple Loch, within Clyde Muirshiel Regional Park, and 2 miles (3.2 km) west of Howwood on the B787, then on to the B776. The late Gothic church is under the protection of Historic Environment Scotland as a Scheduled monument.

Location of the Castle Semple Collegiate Church

== History ==
John Sempill, 1st Lord Sempill founded the collegiate church near Castle Semple, in circa 1504. It had a provost, six chaplains or prebendaries, two boys, and a sacristan. James IV of Scotland visited John's house at Eliotston and the collegiate church on 26 July 1505. The king gave an offering of 14 shillings in the "New College." A stone in the outer wall bears the letters R. L. S., and the arms of Sempill and Montgomerie. The church is 71.5 feet (21.8 m) in length; 24.25 feet (7.39 m) in width; and 15.5 feet (4.7 m) in height. Its walls are covered with ivy. The roof was removed in the 1800s, and the ivy has penetrated into the interior. In ancient times, there appears to have been a village at this place, and a chapel in its neighbourhood dedicated to St. Bride.

== Design and architecture ==
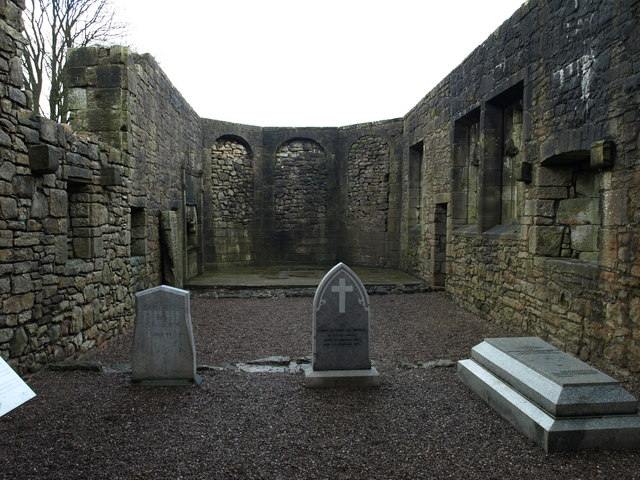
Interior view, Castle Semple Collegiate Church.

The building is a simple oblong, terminating toward the east in a three-sided apse, and having a square tower projecting from the centre of the west wall. The forms of the double windows indicate that they are very late survivals of Gothic architecture. The other windows in the side walls are altered, but they do not present any features like those of the apse. Over the door to the chancel are two coats of arms with the letters R. L. S. and A. M. S., one shield bearing the Sempill arms and the other those of Montgomerie. The square tower at the west end is extremely simple. The tower and most of the side walls are of about the date of the original foundation, while the east apse has been added in the 16th century, to receive the monument of John, Lord Sempill, who died at the Battle of Flodden in 1513. A few remains of the original squareheaded windows in the side walls are still traceable. The interior was divided by two solid walls into three compartments, so as to form separate private burial places. In the eastern compartment, there is a large monument to Lord Sempill. A monumental slab in the central compartment is erected in memory of Gabriel Sempel, who died in 1587.
