= John Sempill, 1st Lord Sempill =

Scottish peer

John Sempill, 1st Lord Sempill of Eliotstoun (died 9 September 1513) was a Scottish peer.

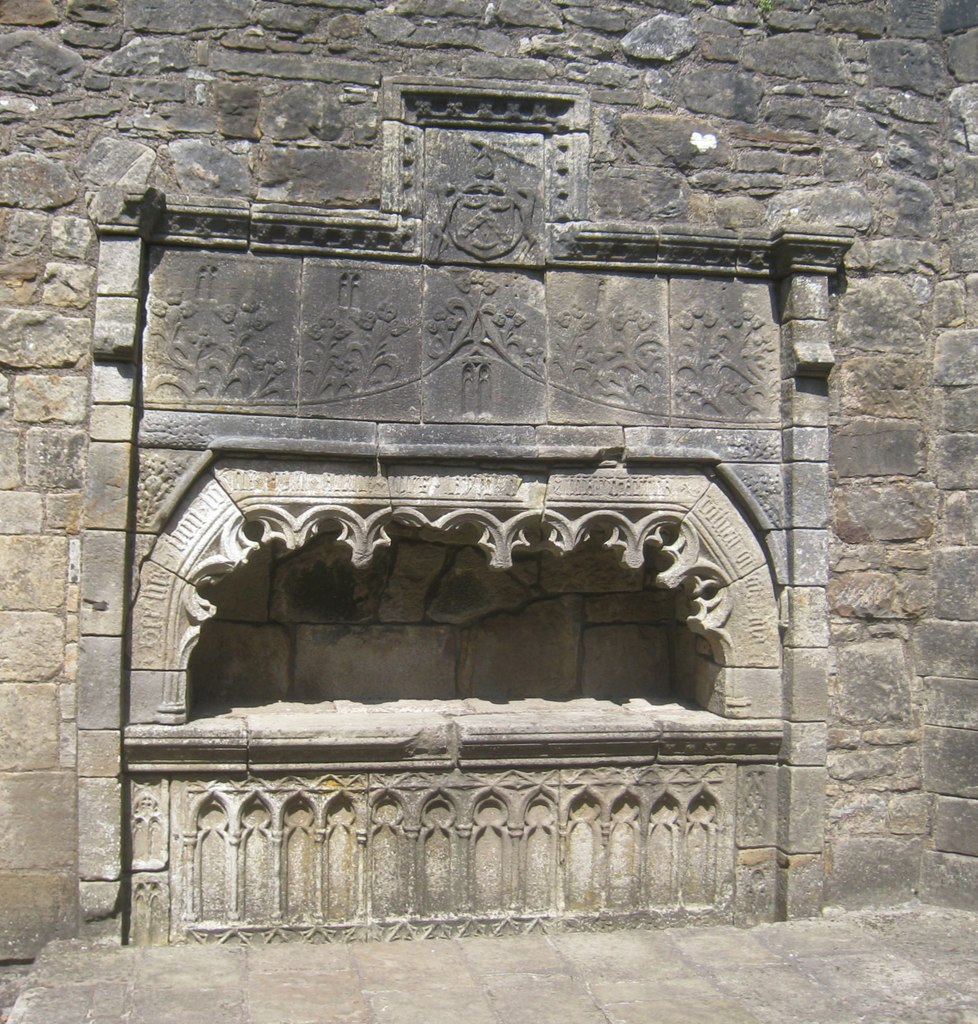
Tomb of Lord John Sempill and wife.

== Career ==
John Sempill was the founder of Castle Semple Collegiate Church near Lochwinnoch. He was created Lord Sempill in the Peerage of Scotland around 1489. Lord Sempill's father, Sir Thomas had been killed fighting for James III of Scotland at the battle of Sauchieburn. John built another chapel at Southannan in West Kilbride parish.

He was one of the ambassadors sent to England at Michaelmas 1492. King Henry VII gave him a gift of £20.

James IV of Scotland was entertained by Lord Sempill's harper at Paisley on 30 June 1504. Next year, the King visited Sempill's house at Eliotston and the collegiate church. The king gave an offering of 14 shillings in the "New College" on 26 July 1505.

Lord Sempill was killed at the Battle of Flodden in September 1513. He was succeeded in the lordship by his son William.

== Marriages and children ==
Sempill married Margaret Colville (d.c. 1504), daughter of Sir Robert Colville of Ochiltree. Their children included:

- William Sempill, 2nd Lord Sempill
- Francis Sempill
- Gabriel Sempill of Ladymure and Cathcart, who married Jonet Spreule, (killed 1547 Battle of Pinkie Cleugh)
- Marian Sempill
- Isabel Sempill

Sempill married secondly Margaret Crichton, daughter of James Crichton of Ruthvendenny and widow of Sir William Stirling of Keir

Peerage of Scotland
New creation	Lord Sempill c. 1489–1513	Succeeded by William Sempill
