= Mzamane =

Surname list

Mzamane is a surname, and may refer to:

- Godfrey Mzamane (1909–1977), a novelist, literary historian, academic and intellectual pioneer
- Dumisani Mzamane (1932–1997), a medical doctor, South Africa's first black nephrologist
- Joab Mzamane (1920–1989), an agriculturalist and father of Sitembele Mzamane
- Joe Mzamane (1918–1993), an Anglican priest, mayor and father of Mbulelo Mzamane
- Mbulelo Mzamane (1948–2014), a South African author, poet, and academic
- Sitembele Mzamane (1952– ), a South African Anglican bishop
