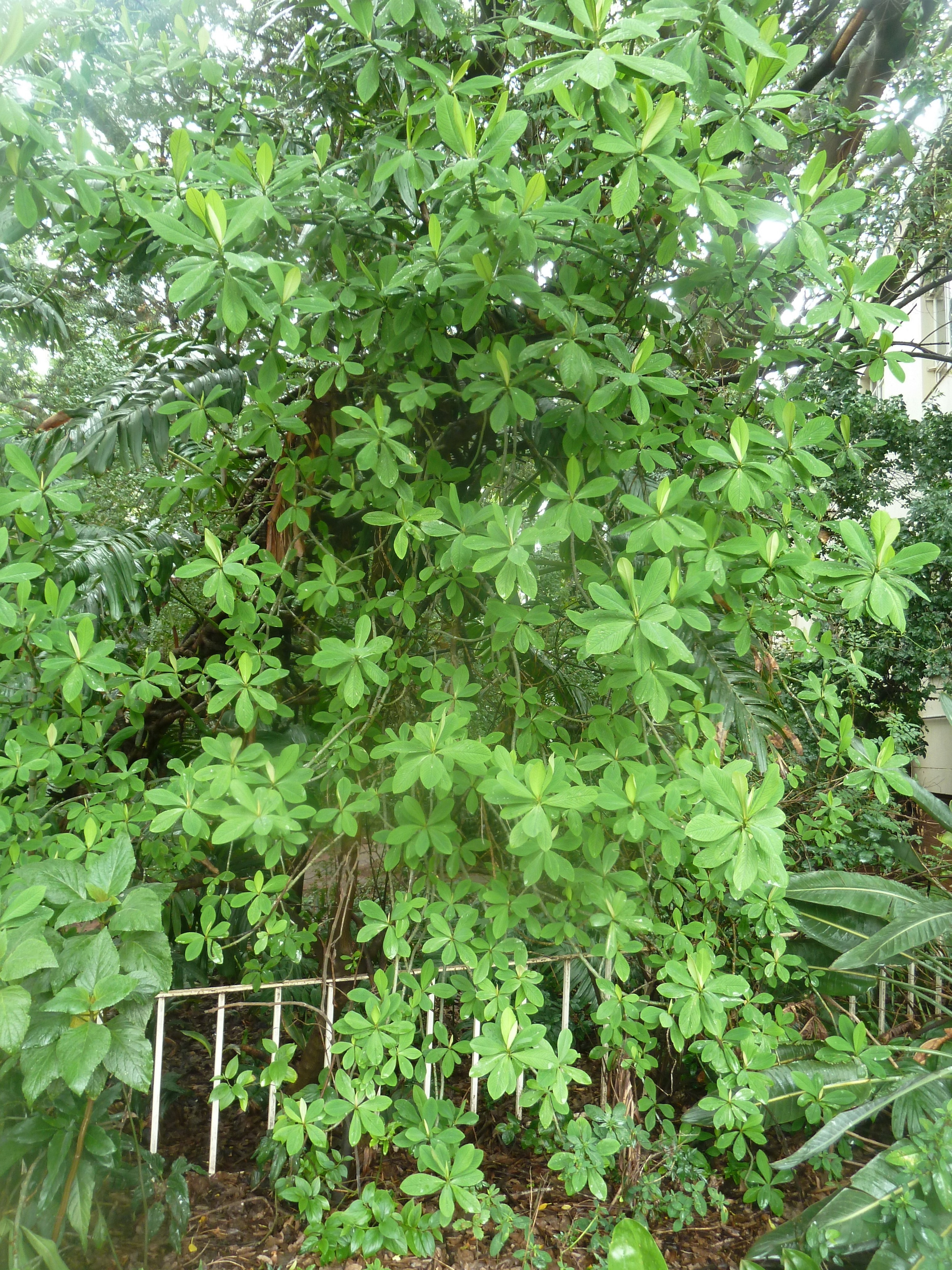

Conservation status
- Least Concern (IUCN 3.1)

Scientific classification
- Kingdom: Plantae
- Clade: Tracheophytes
- Clade: Angiosperms
- Clade: Eudicots
- Clade: Rosids
- Order: Malpighiales
- Family: Euphorbiaceae
- Genus: Euphorbia
- Species: E. cupularis

Binomial name
- Euphorbia cupularis Boiss.

Synonyms
- Euphorbia arborescens E.Mey.; Euphorbia synadenia Baill.; Synadenium arborescens Boiss.; Synadenium cupulare (Boiss.) L.C.Wheeler ex A.C.White, R.A.Dyer & B.Sloane

= Euphorbia cupularis =

Species of flowering plant

Euphorbia cupularis, referred to by the common name dead-man's tree (Zulu: umdlebe) is a succulent tree or shrub of the spurge family, Euphorbiaceae. It is found in South Africa and Eswatini.

== Description ==
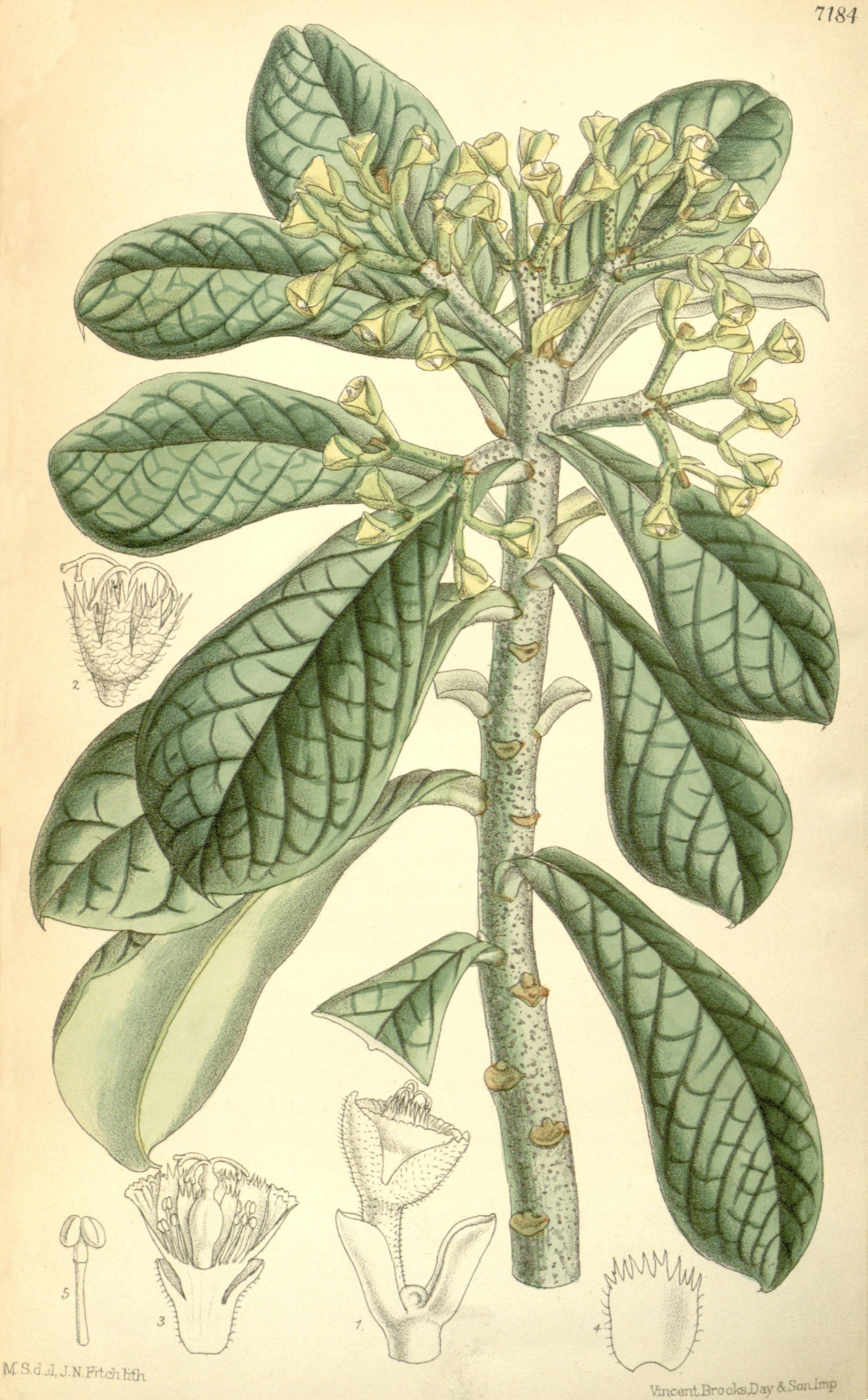
Color lithograph of E. cupularis

The dead-man's tree is very poisonous. Like all Euphorbia, the sap or "latex" is harmful, and that of E. cupularis gives off an irritating vapour. Contact with the eye can cause considerable destruction and with the mouth a rash, swelling, and peeling of the skin. John Medley Wood, a Natal botanist, said the plant must be handled with caution. After "covering his face, keeping at arms length from the plant, and carefully washing hands and face...felt the effects on the eyelids, nostrils, and lips for several hours..." However, those cultivating the plant at Kew Gardens frequently handle the plant without feeling any effects.Seedlings start non-toxic and become toxic after some damage. Touching it without harming it disables its toxic properties.

== Zulu legend and myth ==
The Zulu name for the tree is umdlebe and its toxic properties are described in their oral tradition. In 1828 Zulu Kingdom troops attacked the lands of Soshangane to their north. Messengers returning to King Shaka are said to have reported:

Between the Matolo and Nkomazi rivers we had many unpleasant mishaps:
Some of our men were poisoned by the terrible mdlebe plant;

— Mazisi Kunene in Emperor Shaka the Great

Shaka's half-brother Dingana returned secretly from the campaign to assassinate him, leaving many of the other warriors to die

Ngqongqo-yem 'khonto ibang' izililo.
INkom' eyabuya yodwa kwaSoshangana,
Ezinye ziyofa umdlebe.

— Izibongo Zikadingana [The Praises of Dingana]
Translation:

Cluster-of-spears causing grief.
Cow that came back alone from Soshangana's land,
While others would go on to [their] death from the synadenium tree.

The Zulu also refer to E. cupularis as umbhulelo: a harmful poison or medicine used in a trap, of which umdlebe is one, or an ingredient of one. Used by witches, it is usually considered wholly vile, any association with umdlebe is proof the person in question is an umthakathi: one who secretly uses evil medicine or charms.

Missionary Henry Callaway, living near the Umkomazi River recorded stories of the magical and spiritual power of the umdlebe tree in The Religious System of the Amazulu. He guesses the tree is "probably a kind of aspen" and reminds him of the upas of Java, but that "much that is said about it is doubtless fabulous and wholly untrustworthy."

An additional report appeared in an 1882 note in the journal Nature written by Reverend G. W. Parker, a missionary in Madagascar. He describes two types: a small, shrub-like form, and a larger tree with two layers of bark—a dead outer layer, and a new living layer that grows beneath it; both are described as having red and black fruit and brittle, glossy, lanceolate leaves. Parker notes the umdhlebe is reported to grow in a variety of habitats, but to prefer rocky ground and that due to superstition, the area around the tree is never inhabited despite often being fertile'.

Responding to Parker's letter, a writer identified only as 'H.M.C.' proposed that the word 'umdhlebe' is a derivative of the Zulu root hlaba, and speculated that the legend may have its origin in accounts of one or more members of the spurge family.

== Sources ==
- Berglund, A. (1976). Zulu thought-patterns and symbolism. C.Hurst.
- Brown, N. E.; Hutchinson, J.; Prain, D. (1925). Synadenium arborescens. Vol. 5. p. 216.
- Bryant, A. T. (1905). A Zulu-English dictionary. The Mariannhill Mission Press.
- Callaway, Henry (1884) [1868]. The Religious System of the Amazulu (in English and Zulu). Springvale, Natal: The Folk-Lore Society – via Internet Archive.
- Carter, S.; Leach, L.C. (2001). Synadenium cupulare (Boiss.) Wheeler. Vol. 9. part 5. Euphorbiaceae.
- H.M.C. (9 November 1882). "The Umdhlebe Tree of Zululand". Nature. 27 (680): 32. Bibcode:1882Natur..27...32H. doi:10.1038/027032a0. S2CID 4075640.
- Kunene, Mazisi (1979). Emperor Shaka the great. Heinemann.
- Parker, G. W.; Thistleton Dyer, W. T. (2 November 1882). "Umdhlebi Tree of Zululand". Nature. 27 (679): 7. Bibcode:1882Natur..27Q...7T. doi:10.1038/027007a0. S2CID 182942210.
- Sharp, T. (1939). "The Sheba Valley Death Tree—Synadenium Arborescens". The Cactus Journal. 8 (1): 24. JSTOR 42785035.
- Tropp, Jacob (2003). "The Python and the Crying Tree". The International Journal of African Historical Studies. 36 (3): 511–532. doi:10.2307/3559432. JSTOR 3559432.
- Watt, J. M.; Breyer-Brandwijk, M. G. (1932). The Medicinal And Poisonous Plants of Southern Africa. E. & S. Livingstone.
- Wood, J. M.; Evans, M. S. (1899). Natal plants. Vol. 3. Bennett & Davis. Plate 296.
