= Bill Down =

British Anglican bishop (1934–2025)

- Assistant Bishop of Leicester
- Diocese: Diocese of Leicester
- In office: 1995–2001
- Predecessor: Godfrey Ashby
- Successor: John Austin
- Other posts: Bishop of Bermuda (1990–1995); Honorary assistant bishop in Oxford (2001–2021)

Orders
- Ordination: 1959 (deacon); 1960 (priest)
- Consecration: 1990

Personal details
- Born: 15 July 1934 Surrey, United Kingdom
- Died: 4 February 2025 (aged 90) Oxford, United Kingdom
- Denomination: Anglican
- Parents: William & Beryl Down
- Spouse: Sylvia Aves (m. 1960)
- Children: 2 sons; 2 daughters
- Profession: Missionary; writer
- Education: St John's College, Cambridge

William John Denbigh Down (15 July 1934 – 4 February 2025) was a British cleric who was the ninth Bishop of Bermuda and later the Assistant Bishop of Leicester.

== Biography ==
Educated at St John's College, Cambridge, Down was ordained in 1960. His first post was as a curate at St Paul's Church, Salisbury, after which he was secretary to the Missions to Seaman, chaplain of St Michael Paternoster Royal, and honorary chaplain to the Carmen's Company until his ordination to the episcopate in 1990. He returned to England as the Assistant Bishop of Leicester in 1995 before retiring in 2001. He was ultimately honorary assistant bishop in the Diocese of Oxford, where he settled at Witney.

Down died on 4 February 2025, at the age of 90.

Church of England titles
Preceded by Christopher Luxmoore	Bishop of Bermuda; 1990–1996	Succeeded by Ewen Ratteray
Preceded by Godfrey Ashby	Assistant Bishop of Leicester; 1995–2001	Vacant Title next held by John Austin
