= Godfrey Ashby =

British Anglican bishop, theologian, and academic

- Bishop of St John's (1980–1985); Assistant Bishop of Leicester
- Diocese: Diocese of St Johns, the Anglican Church of Southern Africa; Diocese of Leicester
- In office: 1980-1985; 1987–1995
- Successor: Jacob Dlamini; Bill Down
- Other post: Dean of Grahamstown (1975–1980)

Orders
- Ordination: 1955 (deacon); 1955 (priest)
- Consecration: 1980

Personal details
- Born: 6 November 1930
- Died: 29 December 2023 (aged 93) The College of St Barnabas, Lingfield, Surrey
- Denomination: Anglican
- Parents: William & Vera Hickey
- Spouse: Sally Hawtree (m. 1957–2015)
- Children: 4 sons; 2 daughters
- Profession: Writer (theologian)
- Education: King's College London

Godfrey William Ernest Candler Ashby (6 November 1930 – 29 December 2023) was a British Anglican bishop, theologian, and academic. From 1980 to 1985, he was the eighth Bishop of St John's in the Anglican Church of Southern Africa. From 1988 to 1995, he was the Assistant Bishop of Leicester in the Church of England.

== Early life ==
Ashby was educated at The King's School in Chester, Cheshire. After two years in the British Army Intelligence Corps, he studied at King's College London, and graduated in 1954 with a Bachelor of Divinity (BD) degree and the Associateship of King's College (AKC). He was an Overseas Visiting Scholar at St John's College, Cambridge, in 1975. He also became a Doctor of Philosophy (PhD).

== Ordained ministry ==
Ashby was ordained in the Church of England as a deacon in 1955 and as a priest in 1955. His first post was as a Curate in the Parish of St Helier in the Diocese of Southwark.

In 1958, Ashby emigrated to South Africa. Here he rose steadily in the church hierarchy, being successively: Subwarden of St Paul's College, Grahamstown; Rector of Alice, Eastern Cape; lecturer at the Federal Theological Seminary, Alice; a senior lecturer in Old Testament and Hebrew at Rhodes University; Dean of Grahamstown and Archdeacon in the Diocese of Grahamstown.

=== Episcopal ministry ===
In 1980, Ashby was consecrated a bishop. From 1980 to 1985, he served as diocesan Bishop of St John's. He was then professor of Divinity at the University of the Witwatersrand and an assistant bishop in the Anglican Diocese of Johannesburg.

In 1988, Ashby moved back to England. He served as the Assistant Bishop of Leicester in the Diocese of Leicester from 1988 to 1995. Additionally, he was Priest-in-Charge of All Saints, Newtown Linford between 1992 and 1995. In 1993, he was made an Honorary Canon of Leicester Cathedral.

Ashby retired from full-time ministry in 1995. He returned to South Africa, where he served as an Assistant Bishop in the Diocese of George. In 2008, he returned to England. He served as an honorary assistant bishop in the Diocese of Portsmouth between 2008 and 2011 and in the Diocese of Exeter (in which he lived at Broadclyst, Devon) from 2011 until he entered full retirement at the College of St Barnabas in Surrey in 2017.

== Personal life ==
Bishop Ashby was married to Valerie "Sally" Ashby, née Hawtree (she died on 7 October 2015). Together, they had six children: Garmon, John Mark, Mary, Philip, Ruth, and Charles.

== Publications ==
- Theodoret of Cyrrhus as exegete of the Old Testament. Grahamstown: Rhodes University. 1972. ISBN 9780949980168.
- Sacrifice: its nature and purpose. SCM. 1988. ISBN 978-0-334-01437-9.
- Go Out and Meet God: A Commentary on the Book of Exodus. Wm. B. Eerdmans Publishing. January 1998. ISBN 978-0-8028-4332-6.
- Translation of The Stone Mason of Saint-Point by Alphonse de Lamartine. Cambridge Scholars Publishing. February 2016. ISBN 1-4438-7798-0

Anglican Church of Southern Africa titles
| Preceded by Michael Nuttall | Dean of Grahamstown; 1975–1980 | Succeeded by Roy Barker |
| Preceded by James Schuster | Bishop of St John's; 1980–1985 | Succeeded by Jacob Dlamini |
| New title | Assistant Bishops of Leicester; 1987–1995 | Succeeded by Bill Down |
