= Peter Masiza =

First black Anglican priest ordained in South Africa

- Born: c. 1840; Shiloh, near Whittlesea, Eastern Cape
- Died: 3 December 1907 (aged 66–67); Tsomo, Eastern Cape

Peter (Petrus) K. Masiza (c. 1840 – 1907) was the first black Anglican priest ordained in South Africa.

== Early life ==
Masiza was born in Shiloh, near Whittlesea, Eastern Cape in about 1840. He grew up in the Moravian Church.

In 1871 Peter's brother, Paul Masiza was ordained deacon in the Anglican Church of Southern Africa by the Henry Cotterill, bishop of Grahamstown. Paul died two years later; Peter Masiza followed in his brother's footsteps: he was ordained deacon in 1873 and later becoming the first black Anglican priest in South Africa, when on 24 June 1877 Henry Callaway, the first bishop of St John's ordained Masiza the first Xhosa priest in St John's Cathedral, Mthatha, and later the first black canon.

== Commemoration ==
The Anglican Church of Southern Africa commemorates Masiza in its Calendar of saints on the 5th day of December each year. In addition the collect for this commemoration is as follows:

Merciful Lord
we thank you for your servant Peter Masiza
the first African priest of our province:
inspire us after his example to be ready at all times
for the coming of your Son
our Saviour Jesus Christ who is alive and reigns
with you and the Holy Spirit,
one God now and for ever

== Notes and references ==
- Goedhals, M. M. (1999). "Masiza, Peter (Petrus) K.". In Nelly E Sonderling (ed.). New Dictionary of South African Biography. Vol. 2. HSRC Press. ISBN 978-18682-8133-6.
- Stanier Green, Dora (1974). The first hundred years 1873-1973: the story of the Diocese of St. John's South Africa. Paul's Mission Press. ISBN 9780620007733.
- Chidester, David (2014). Religions of South Africa. Routledge. ISBN 978-1-317-64987-8.
- Lewis, Cecil; Edwards, G. E. (1935). South Africa: The Growth of the Church of the Province. London: Society For Promoting Christian Knowledge. Archived from the original on 24 February 2014.
- Denis, Philippe (2007), Missionaries from Within: The Contribution of Indigenous Clergy to Evangelisation in Southern Africa, Pretoria, hdl:10500/4453
- Denis, Philippe (2012). "The Beginnings of Anglican Theological Education in South Africa, 1848–1963". The Journal of Ecclesiastical History. 63 (3): 516–533. doi:10.1017/S0022046910002988. ISSN 0022-0469.
- Goedhals, M. M. (September 1989). "Ungumpriste: a study of the life of Peter Masiza, first black priest in the Church of the Province of Southern Africa". Journal of Theology for Southern Africa. 68: 17–28.
