= John Austin (bishop) =

British bishop (1939–2007)

- Bishop of Aston
- Diocese: Diocese of Birmingham
- In office: 1992 – July 2005 (retired)
- Predecessor: Colin Buchanan
- Successor: Andrew Watson
- Other post: Assistant Bishop of Leicester (2005–2007)

Orders
- Ordination: 1964 (deacon); 1965 (priest) by Mervyn Stockwood, at Southwark Cathedral (deacon)
- Consecration: 1992

Personal details
- Born: 14 March 1939 Surbiton, Surrey, United Kingdom
- Died: 17 August 2007 (aged 68)
- Denomination: Anglican
- Parents: John & Margaret
- Spouse: Rosemary King (m. 1971)
- Children: 2 sons: Fenner & Jacob; 1 daughter: Naomi
- Education: St Edmund Hall, Oxford

John Michael Austin OBE (14 March 1939 – 17 August 2007) was the Bishop of Aston from 1992 to 2005, filling a post which had been vacant since the previous incumbent Colin Buchanan resigned in 1989. After Austin the post again remained vacant for three years until the Diocese announced the appointment of Andrew Watson to fill the post In retirement, he served the Diocese of Leicester as stipendiary assistant bishop – called Assistant Bishop of Leicester – from 2005 until 2007.

Austin was educated at Worksop College and St Edmund Hall, Oxford (proceeding Oxford Master of Arts {MA(Oxon)}). He was ordained in 1965 and began his ordained ministry with a curacy at St John the Evangelist's East Dulwich. He then held positions in Chicago and Walworth before becoming the Social Responsibility Adviser to the Diocese of St Albans. Appointed the Director of the London Diocesan Board for Social Responsibility in 1984, he was a committed campaigner for social justice.

== Sources ==
- Guardian obituary
- Birmingham diocese obituary
- Telegraph obituary

Church of England titles
Vacant Title last held by Colin Buchanan	Bishop of Aston; 1992–2005	Vacant Title next held by Andrew Watson
Vacant Title last held by Bill Down	Assistant Bishop of Leicester; 2005–2007	Vacant Title next held by Christopher Boyle
