= Ranby, Nottinghamshire =

Village in Nottinghamshire, England

Coordinates: 53°19′N 1°01′W

Ranby
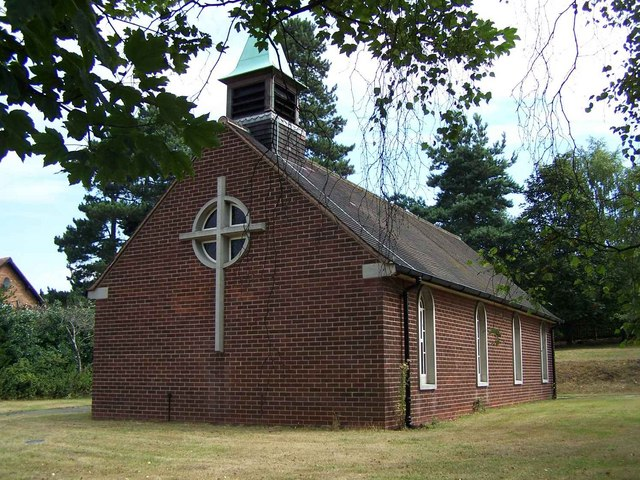
- The church of St Martin, Ranby
- Civil parish: Babworth
- District: Bassetlaw
- Shire county: Nottinghamshire
- Region: East Midlands
- Country: England
- Sovereign state: United Kingdom
- Post town: RETFORD
- Postcode district: DN22
- Dialling code: 01777
- Police: Nottinghamshire
- Fire: Nottinghamshire
- Ambulance: East Midlands
- UK Parliament: Bassetlaw

Ranby is a small village in the north of Nottinghamshire, next to the Chesterfield Canal and adjacent to the A1. It is in the civil parish of Babworth. It is known for its two schools, the prep school Worksop College Preparatory School (formerly Ranby House) and the primary school Ranby Primary School, and the nearby church All Saints Babworth.

Ranby Prison is located on the A620 to Retford. The Prison has been updated over the last 5 years and houses an increasing number of inmates.

Nearby stood Morton Hall that was built for William Mason J.P. in the 1860s. His children included Agnes Mason, Harriet Mason and Arthur James Mason. The hall was demolished in 1946. The grounds of the hall contained a "Money Stone". The one metre high stone commemorates a hoard found in 1802 containing 621 Roman copper and silver coins. The 1802 stone is now listed.

== Notable people ==
- Agnes Mason, founded the Community of the Holy Family
- Arthur James Mason (1851–1928), clergyman, theologian, was the son of G. W. Mason, of Morton Hall
- Harriet Mason, Poor Law Inspector
