= College of the Transfiguration =

Anglican seminary in South Africa

Coordinates: 33°18′33″S 26°30′47″E

The College of the Transfiguration in Makhanda, Eastern Cape, is the only provincial residential college of the Anglican Church of Southern Africa, offering a contextual approach to theology studies.

The college opened in 1993, following the amalgamation of the colleges of St Bede's, Mthatha and St Paul's, Grahamstown. Although the buildings and location were inherited from St Paul's, the college's growth has been marked by the spirit, motives and perceptions that sustained both former colleges.

== Before 1993 ==
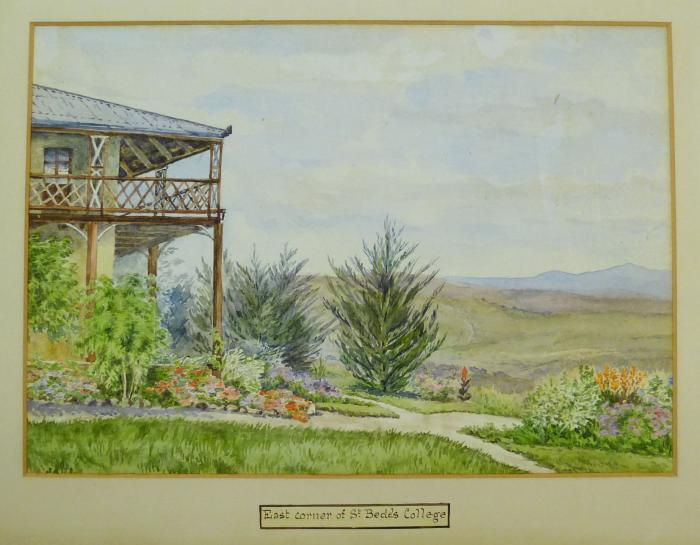
St Bede's College by Harriet Mason c. 1901

St Bede's College in Mthatha was founded in 1879 by Henry Callaway, the first bishop of the Diocese of St John. The purpose of the institution was the "training of young natives, and colonists as clergy and teachers." At that time the primary task was to train clergy and catechist for the diocese. A shift happened in the mid-twentieth century when the college was given some provincial recognition as a result of a synod of bishops in 1955. Pressures brought to bear by the apartheid regime, and other institutional factors, resulted in the consideration of different schemes of amalgamation as early as the seventies. The college was temporarily closed in 1983 and the premises were leased to the University of Transkei for a year, before being re-opened in 1985. At the time of its closure in 1992 the college had an influential role in the Anglican Church of Southern Africa.

St Paul's College in Grahamstown was founded in 1902, by Bishop Charles Cornish. The initial idea of a college came from Bishop Allan Webb, Bishop of Grahamstown. He brought a vision of theological education with him, having been vice-principal of Cuddesdon Theological College, Oxford. The hostel was opened for the reception of theological students in 1902. In 1910 work began on a new west wing to increase its capacity. The college also officially became a Provincial college. Between 1929 and 1931 further alterations took place. Cullen House was purchased in 1933. The college went through difficult times during both world wars as numbers declined, even closing for five months in 1943. Extensive additions were again made in the 1950s, with the Espin Wing and new chapel being dedicated in 1957. The Burnett wing was completed in 1962. Like St Bede's, St Paul's was affected by fluctuating numbers. It was also faced with the particular pressures of apartheid as it sought to be racially mixed. At the time of its closure in 1992 the college was about eighty percent "black".

When the St Bede's and St Paul's were closed, the site chosen for the new college for the Anglican Church of Southern Africa was the old campus of St Paul's. The amalgamated college was initially called "Peter Masiza College", after the first ordained black priest in the province. Subsequent research showed that the name was problematic and the "College of the Transfiguration" was chosen, influenced by the then, Archbishop Desmond Tutu.

=== List of wardens of St Paul's College ===
- c.1911 - Canon Edward Mason, brother of Agnes Mason
- ... others
- 1965-1976 Canon John N Suggit

== Post 1993 ==
=== List of rectors of COTT ===
- 1993 - Canon Luke Lungile Pato
- 2000 - Canon Livingstone Ngewu
- 2007 - The Rev. Janet Trisk (acting)
- 2008 - Canon Bill Domeris
- 2011 - Barney Pityana
- 2015 - Vicentia Kgabe
- 2022 - Percy Chinganga

== Bibliography ==
- Field, Katherine. "Mason, (Marianne) Harriet". Oxford Dictionary of National Biography (online ed.). Oxford University Press. doi:10.1093/ref:odnb/48847. (Subscription, Wikipedia Library access or UK public library membership required.)
- Suggit, John; Goedhals, Mandy (1998). Change and challenge: essays commemorating the 150th anniversary of the arrival of Robert Gray as first bishop of Cape Town. Church of the Province of Southern Africa. ISBN 978-0-9584213-2-4.
- Zulu, Bellah (12 August 2014). "SA Anglicans appoint first woman to lead theological college". Anglican News.
