= St John Evans =

Henry St John Tomlinson Evans (known as St John; 1905 – 25 July 1956) was the sixth Bishop of St John's in what was then known as Kaffraria and is now Mthatha. Educated at Merchant Taylors' and St John's College, Oxford he was ordained in 1928. From 1931 until 1941 he held posts in what is now Ghana, ending his time there as Archdeacon of Ashanti. A chaplain to the Forces from 1942 to 1944 he was then appointed Director of Missions in Southern Rhodesia before elevation to the episcopate in 1951. He died in post on 25 July 1956.

== Notes ==
Anglican Church of Southern Africa titles
Preceded by Theodore Gibson	Bishop of St John's; 1951 – 1956	Succeeded by James Schuster
