= Jacob Dlamini =

Jacob Dlamini is the name of:

- Jacob Dlamini (author), South African journalist, historian and author
- Jacob Dlamini (bishop)
