= Geoff Davies (bishop) =

Geoffrey Francis Davies was the inaugural bishop of Umzimvubu. Born in 1941 and educated at the Universities of Cape Town and Cambridge he studied for ordination at Ripon College Cuddesdon before beginning his ecclesiastical career with a curacy at St Mary The Boltons, West Brompton. The rest of his ministry was to be spent in Africa, firstly as Priest in Charge of Serowe, at the time the largest village in Botswana and latterly South Africa.

Here he rose steadily in the Church hierarchy, being successively rector of Kalk Bay, Director of Mission within the Church of the Province of Southern Africa, suffragan bishop of St John's and finally the diocesan bishop of Umzimvubu. After retiring from the diocese in 2003, he initiated the Southern African Faith Communities' Environment Institute, a multi-faith environment non-governmental organization inaugurated by Nobel Peace Prize winner, Wangari Maathai, in July 2005. With the vision of "Faith communities committed to cherishing living Earth", SAFCEI promotes caring for people and the planet as a moral issue which should be firmly on the agenda of every faith community.

In 2016, he was awarded the Langton Award for Community Service by the Archbishop of Canterbury "for his farsighted commitment to environmental concerns".

== Notes ==
Anglican Church of Southern Africa titles
New diocese	Bishop of Umzimvubu; 1991–2003	Succeeded by Mlibo Mteteleli Ngewu
