= Edward Etheridge =

British Anglican bishop (1872–1954)

The Right Reverend Edward Etheridge
- Bishop of St John's
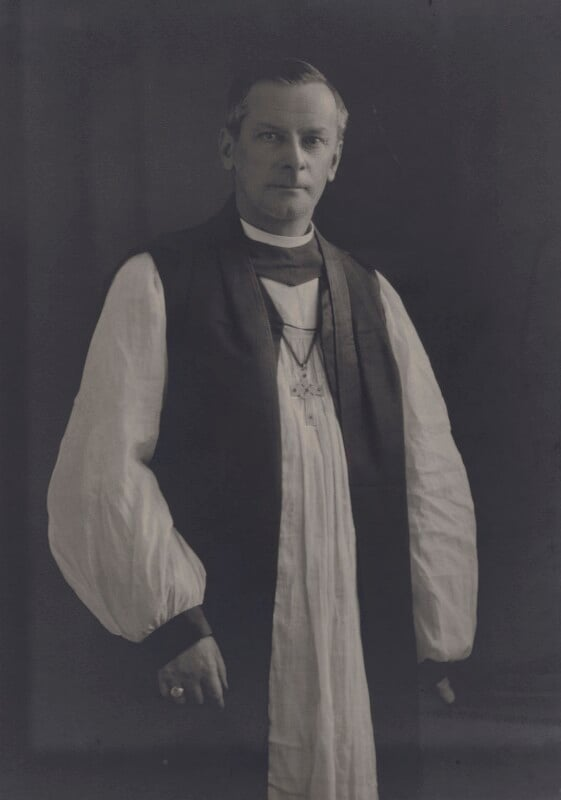
- Etheridge, 1923–30s
- Church: Anglican
- Province: Southern Africa
- Diocese: Diocese of St John's

The Rt Revd Edward Harold Etheridge (1872–1954) was the 4th Bishop of St John's in what was then known as Kaffraria and is now Mthatha.

Educated at Marlborough and Keble College, Oxford he was ordained in 1895. He began his career with curacies at Kensington and Slough before emigrating to begin missionary work in Mashonaland. Subsequently, the area's archdeacon and additionally an honorary canon of St Mary's Cathedral in Salisbury, Rhodesia (now Harare, Zimbabwe) he was elevated to the episcopate in 1923 and served his mainly rural diocese for twenty years, followed by a further seven as canon chancellor of the Anglican Diocese of Grahamstown. A "quiet, unassuming prelate devoted to his diocese", he died on 16 September 1954.

== Notes ==
Anglican Church of Southern Africa titles
Preceded by Joseph Williams	Bishop of St John's; 1923 – 1943	Succeeded by Theodore Gibson
