= Diocese of Umzimvubu =

The Diocese of Umzimvubu is a diocese of the Anglican Church of Southern Africa created out of a portion of the former Diocese of St John's. It was established in 1991. The current bishop is Phumzile Cetywayo, who was elected in 2024.

The Diocese of Umzimvubu sits on the border of Kwazulu Natal and The Eastern Cape, located in the northern area of the former bantustan of the Transkei. Historically the Diocese, along with the Diocese of Mthatha, formed the larger Diocese of St John's. Consequently, it shares many of the characteristics of this neighbouring diocese.

== List of bishops ==
- Geoff Davies 1991-2003
- Mlibo Ngewu 2003-2017
- Vacant from September 2017-2019 (Vicar General Sitembele Mzamane)
- Tsietsi Edward Seleoane, September 2019-2024
- Phumzile Cetywayo, 2024 - present

== Coat of arms ==
Arms of the Diocese of Umzimvubu

The diocese registered a coat of arms at the Bureau of Heraldry in 1992 : Per fess wavy abaisse, Gules and Azure, a bar wavy abaisse Argent, surmounted by a Celtic cross Or; a chief dancetty Azure filleted Argent; the shield ensigned with a mitre proper.
