= Godfrey Mzamane =

- Born: Godfrey Isaac Malunga Mzamane; 7 March 1909; Fobane, Cape Colony
- Died: 1977 (aged 67–68)
- Occupations: Novelist, academic

Godfrey Isaac Malunga Mzamane (7 March 1909 – 1977) was a novelist, literary historian, academic, human rights activist and intellectual pioneer of African studies in South Africa.

== Early life ==
Godfrey Mzamane was born in Fobane in the Mt. Fletcher district, near Matatiele in the Transkei. His father Seplani Isaac Mzamane was an Anglican church lay preacher and his mother was Julia Mzamane. Godfrey was married to Nompumelelo Mzamane and they had three children. He is Doctor Dumisani Mzamane's uncle as well as Joe Mzamane and Joab Mzamane's second cousin.

== Education ==
Godfrey attended primary school at Umzimkhulu, at the French Evangelical Missionary School there; he also attended Bethesda Moravian Mission School at Lupindo. He graduated standard six in 1921.

In 1926, he studied at St John's College, Mthatha, then at Adam's Teacher Training College in Natal. He also went to Fort Hare for a time.

From 1936 to 1939, he taught at the training school in Mariazell, Matatiele. He also taught at St. Peter's Secondary School in Johannesburg. Godfrey then went to Cape Town to learn museum techniques. In 1942, he was appointed the assistant curator of the F.S. Malan Museum at Fort Hare University College.

He replaced A. C. Jordan as Lecturer in Bantu Languages at Fort Hare University College when Jordan resigned his position in the Department of African Languages in 1946. In 1947, he obtained a BA Degree in African languages, followed by a Masters thesis (or "dissertation"), submitted to the University of South Africa (Unisa) in 1948, entitled A concise treatise on Phuthi with special reference to its relationship with Nguni and Sotho, which was published in 1949 and was an important early contribution to the study of Phuthi language. Godfrey was later a Professor and Head of the Department of African Languages at the University College of Fort Hare

== Activism and writing career ==
While teaching at Fort Hare University College he attracted considerable attention with his work on his classic Xhosa novel, Izinto zodidi (things of value) (1959). This didactic novel published in 1959, concerns the failure of the father, Deyi, to cope with modern life as compared to the splendid scientific achievements of his son, Manzodidi, who goes to Canada to study.

In the late 1940s he served as secretary of the Cape African National Congress and was a member of the ANC national executive committee at the time of the Programme of Action.

== Notes and references ==
- Mzamane, Godfrey Isaac Malunga (1948). A concise treatise on Phuthi with special reference to its relationship with Nguni and Sotho (Thesis). UNISA. hdl:20.500.11892/141362. OCLC 638351316.
- Scheub, Harold (1985). "Xhosa Oral and Literary Traditions". In Andrzejewski, B. W.; Piłaszewicz, Stanisław; Tyloch, Witold (eds.). Literatures in African Languages: Theoretical Issues and Sample Surveys. Cambridge University Press. ISBN 978-0-521-25646-9.
- Herdeck, Donald E. (1973). African Authors: A Companion to Black African Writing. Vol. 1. Black Orpheus Press. ISBN 9780879530082.
- Gerhart, G. M.; Karis, T., eds. (1972). From Protest to Challenge: A Documentary History of Politics in South Africa 1882-1964. Vol. 4 Political profiles 1882-1964. Stanford: Hoover Institution Press.
- "Godfrey I.M. Mzamane". South African History Online. "From Protest to challenge: A documentary History of African Politics in South Africa: 1882–1964, Vol.4 Political Profiles 1882 – 1964"
