= Mlibo Ngewu =

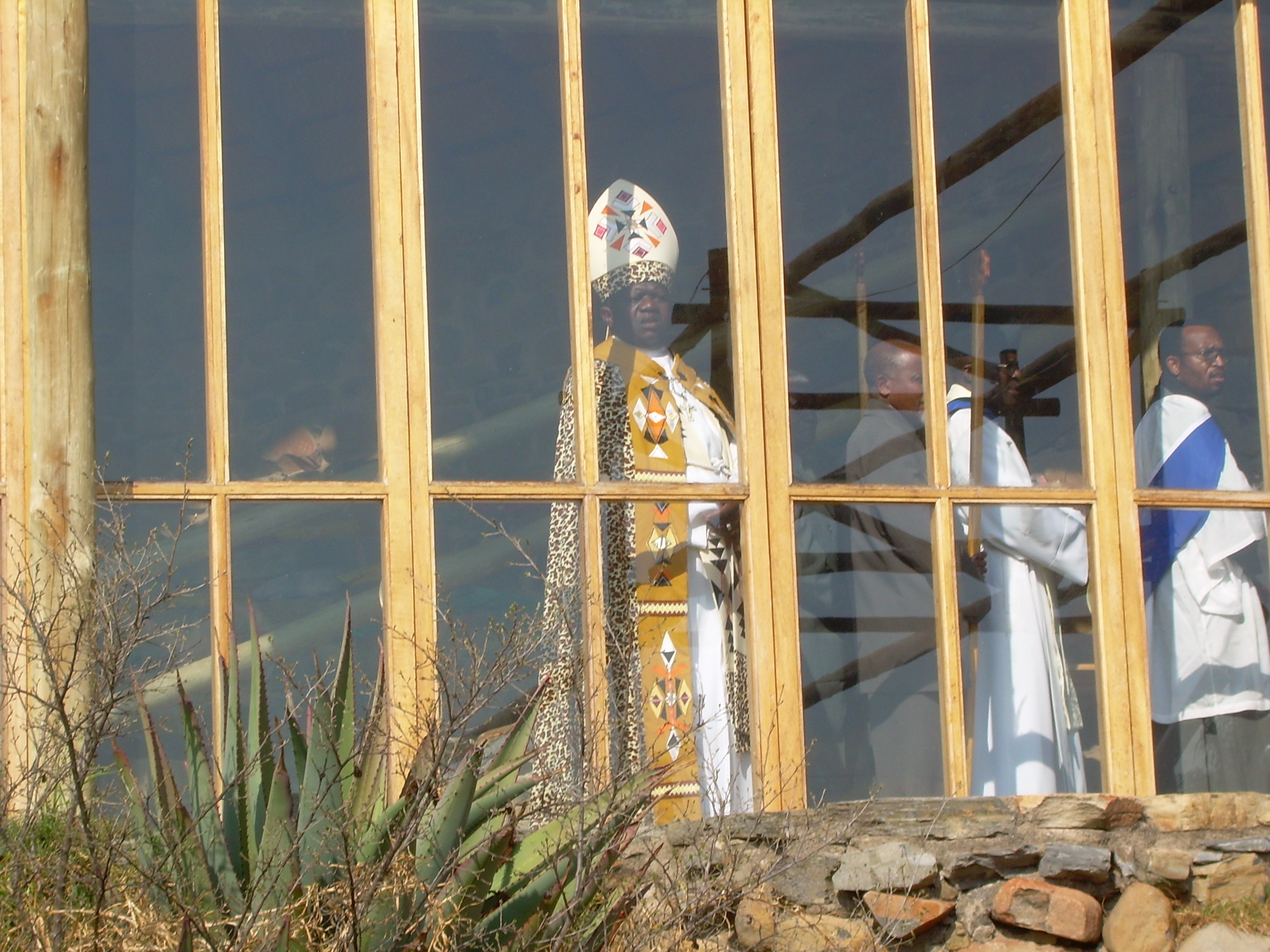
Bishop Mlibo Ngewu before the commencement of the Diocese of Umzimvubu's diocesan Family Day service in Kokstad in July 2006

Mlibo Mteteleli Ngewu is the former bishop of Umzimvubu a diocese in the Anglican Church of Southern Africa. Previously an archdeacon he was appointed in 2003 to succeed the inaugural bishop, Geoffrey Francis Davies. He is a close relative of the late dean of Pretoria, provincial trustee and former rector of the College of the Transfiguration, Lubabalo Livingstone Ngewu.

The seven years of his episcopate have been marked with controversy. Members of his estranged clergy, who refer to themselves as the Concerned Group, have charged him with allegations of authoritarian leadership, which has caused much resentment and embarrassment. As of 19 August 2011, some two thirds of the clergy in his diocese have written to the Archbishop of Cape Town requesting him to intervene. In consequence, he was under investigation on various charges under canon law. The allegations which were under investigation included simony, nepotism, embezzlement, fraud and sexual harassment. Subsequently, Ngewu was exonerated of the charges by a Provincial task force convened by the Anglican Church of Southern Africa. The Archbishop mandated a pastoral team to undertake a visit in order to meet with the presenters, the Bishop and any others concerned in the matters raised, and to seek to resolve the issues concerned through pastoral ministration, which included the dean of the province and bishop of Natal, Rubin Phillip.

In retaliation, the Concerned Group have initiated calls to secede from the embattled diocese and has withheld all parish assessments, that is, monthly contributions from the parishes to the diocese and severed all communications with the diocesan office. Therefore, Ngewu invited the Provincial Synod of Bishops of the Anglican Church of Southern Africa to intervene and deal with the deep seated and complicated issues of the diocese. On 12 February 2012, the Synod of Bishops resolved to place the diocese under the care of the Provincial Administrative Team. The team, appointed by the Archbishop, was mandated to take immediate action to resolve specific legal and financial issues to offer pastoral care for the people, clergy and the bishop; and to initiate a longer term process of reconciliation - a move widely regarded as futile. The state of the diocese still remains highly volatile. As a result, Ngewu has taken an indefinite leave of absence.

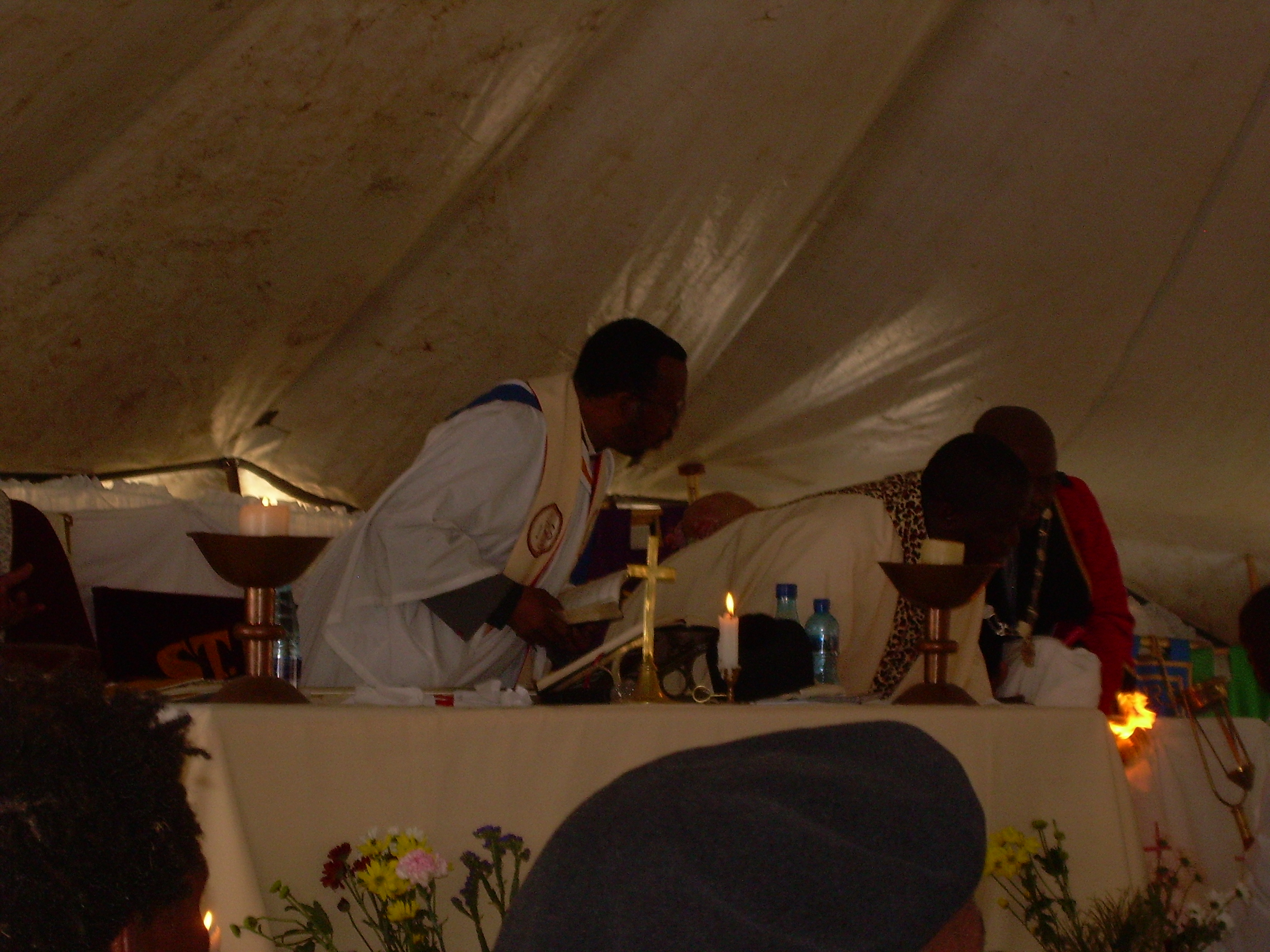
Bishop Mlibo Ngewu attempting to extinguish the altar cloth, which had been inadvertently set alight during the Diocese of Umzimvubu's diocesan Family Day service in Kokstad in July 2006

== Notes ==
Anglican Church of Southern Africa titles
Preceded by Geoffrey Francis Davies	Bishop of Umzimvubu; 2003 – 2017	Succeeded by Tsietsi Edward Seleoane
