= Lydia umkaSetemba =

Zulu prose writer

Lydia umkaSetemba was a Zulu prose writer active in the 1850s and the 1860s. Her work has been claimed as the starting point of modern Zulu literature, and she has been described as one of the "most famous performers of extended narrative". Six narratives which she performed were included in Henry Callaway's 1868 collection of Zulu oral narratives.
