= Bishop of Loughborough =

Anglican ecclesial title

The Bishop of Loughborough is an episcopal title used by the sole suffragan bishop of the Church of England Diocese of Leicester in the Province of Canterbury, England.

From 1987 to 2017, the Assistant Bishop of Leicester was an episcopal title used by the sole stipendiary assistant bishop (effectively suffragan bishop) of the Diocese of Leicester. The title took its name as the bishop who assisted the diocesan Bishop of Leicester. The role was created following the 1986 refusal of a request to create a suffragan bishop for the diocese, and was filled from then only with ad hoc funding arrangements for four bishops already in episcopal orders. Boyle was the only incumbent to serve on a full-time basis.

On 26 November 2016, Leicester Diocesan Synod approved a proposal to replace the Assistant Bishop post with a new suffragan bishop role of Bishop suffragan of Loughborough, following Boyle's retirement in 2017, with the expectation that this could be completed by the end of that year. The proposal was accepted by General Synod in February 2017 and the See was erected by Order of the Privy Council on 12 April 2017.

The bishop's residence is Bishop's House, Rothley, in Charnwood.

== List of bishops ==
Assistant Bishops of Leicester
From	Until	Incumbent	Notes
1987	1995	Godfrey Ashby	
1995	2001	Bill Down	Formerly Bishop of Bermuda
2001	2005	vacant	
2005	2007	John Austin	Retired Bishop of Aston
2007	2009	vacant	
2009	2017	Christopher Boyle	Formerly the last British bishop of Northern Malawi; from 6 September 2009; retired 31 May 2017.
Bishops of Loughborough
2017	2021	Guli Francis-Dehqani	Consecrated 30 November 2017; translated to Chelmsford 11 March 2021
2022	present	Saju Muthalaly	Consecrated 25 January 2022; also part-time Assistant Bishop of Coventry during vacancy-in-see, since November 2023
