= Agnes Mason =

British nun; religious order founder (1849–1941)

Personal life
- Born: 10 August 1849 Laugharne, Carmarthenshire
- Died: 19 December 1941 (aged 92) Holmhurst St Mary, St Leonards-on-Sea

Religious life
- Religion: Anglican
- Order: Community of the Holy Family

Agnes Mason (10 August 1849 – 19 December 1941) was a British nun, notable as the founder of a religious order of the Anglican Communion, the Community of the Holy Family.

== Family and education ==
Mason was born in Laugharne, Carmarthenshire, Wales in 1849. She was the daughter of George William and Marianne Mason of Morton Hall in Nottinghamshire. Her brother Arthur James Mason was to be a Professor at Cambridge and her sister Harriet was a Poor Law inspector and botanical illustrator. Another brother, George Edward Mason, was rector at Whitwell, Derbyshire, and later principal of a theological college in the Transkei (now College of the Transfiguration in South Africa). Mason spent some years educating Edward before, in 1883, she went to Newnham College, Cambridge to read moral sciences.

== Career ==
After gaining her degree she lectured at Bedford College, London.

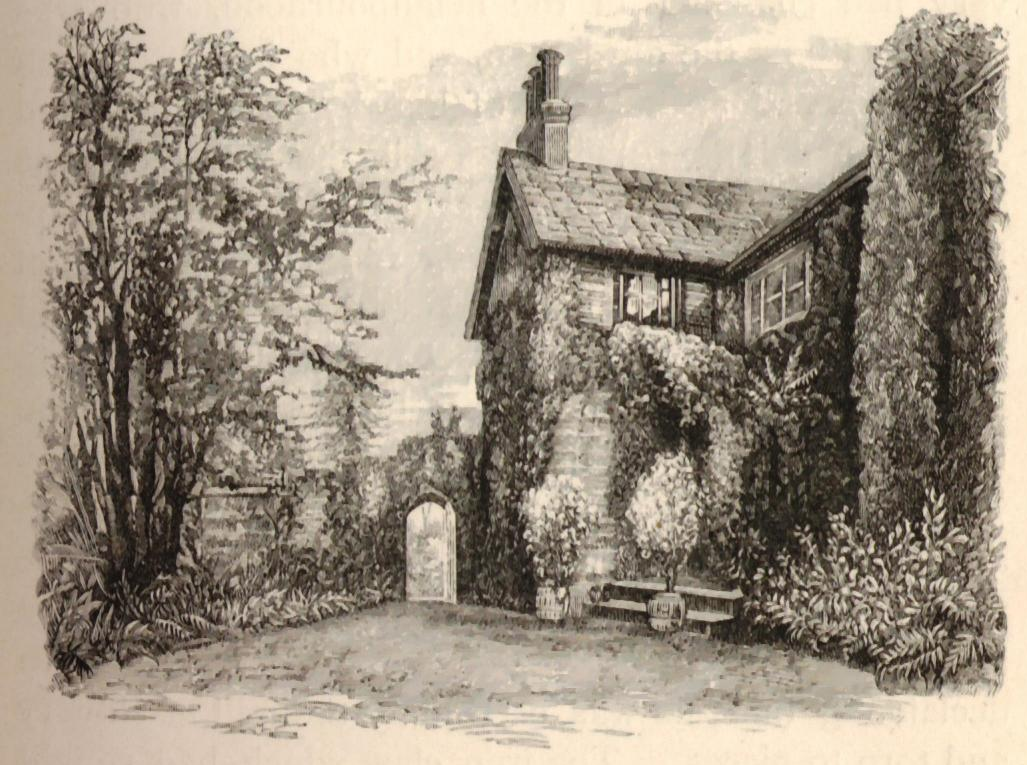
Holmhurst St Mary Mason used this house as a convent

From 1892 to 1895 she worked at the Guild of the Epiphany. She started the Anglican religious order of nuns, the Community of the Holy Family with the help of several supporters. The purpose of the community was to improve women's education. Her supporters were Charles Gore, Bishop of Oxford; Walter Frere, Bishop of Truro; William Collins, Bishop of Gibraltar; George Congreve of the Society of St John the Evangelist; Charles Lindley Wood, 2nd Viscount Halifax, president of the English Church Union; and the Roman Catholic theologian Baron von Hügel.

Frederick Temple, Archbishop of Canterbury, was another of her supporters and he used his authority to establish her as the Mother Superior of this new group. The community remained small but it did establish teaching locations in London, St Leonards-on-Sea, Leeds, and Cambridge, and in India at All Saints' College, Nainital.

In 1913 it obtained its headquarters, or mother house, at Holmhurst St Mary, St Leonards. This was a house once owned by Augustus Hare and it had been extended using the profits from his writing.

Mason died at Holmhurst St Mary on 19 December 1941.

== Works ==
In 1909 Mason published Saint Theresa: The History of Her Foundations, which she had translated.
