= Theodore Gibson =

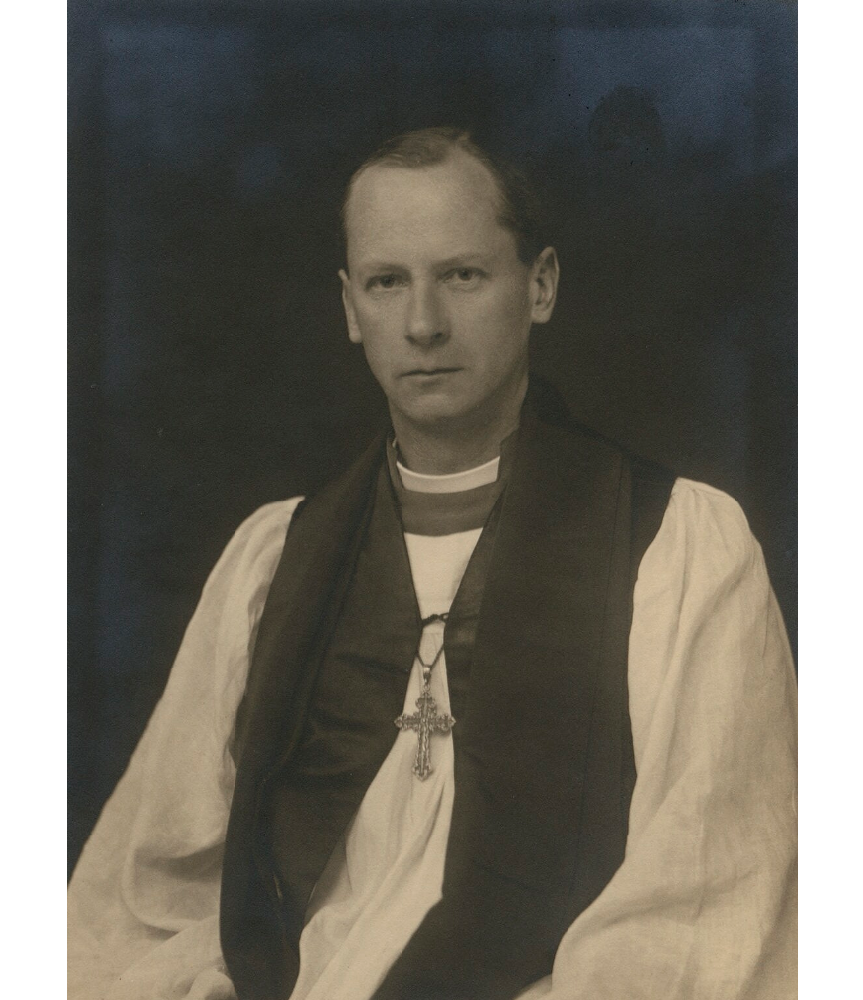
Gibson, c. 1920s

Theodore Sumner Gibson (1885–1953) was the second Anglican Bishop of Kimberley and Kuruman and subsequently the fifth Bishop of St John's from (collectively) 1928 until 1951.

== Early life ==
Born into a clerical family (Note: His father Edgar Charles Sumner Gibson was Bishop of Gloucester from 1905 until 1924) he was educated at Marlborough and Keble College, Oxford. Ordained deacon in 1909 and priest a year later his first post was as curate at All Saints, Wokingham.

== South Africa ==
His next post was in South Africa and, after a brief return to Brixton between 1916 and 1919, he returned to spend the bulk of his career there. After a Chaplaincy to the De Beers work force in Kimberley he rose rapidly within the Diocese of Kimberley and Kuruman. As archdeacon, then bishop of a challenging area his Times obituary noted he

...was a good pastor in a difficult and poor diocese which called for the best from a man who had chosen to follow Christ

— "Right Rev. T. S. Gibson Obituary". The Times. No. 52714. London. 31 August 1953. col E, p. 8.

His episcopate in Kimberley and Kuruman was marked by poverty in the diocese. Prayer intentions for January 1935 included: "Distress in Kimberley and on the River Diggings…"

Similar dedication was shown when he was translated to St John's.

While Cochrane, in his book, The Servants of Power, has written of the church of this era in South Africa as being typified by a "growing interest in apolitical spirituality," it has been noted that Bishop Gibson tracked political matters closely: hardly a bill went before parliament without his having commented on it.

== Madehurst, Sussex ==
On retirement, Gibson was Priest in charge at Madehurst in Sussex.

== Liturgical matters ==
Gibson engaged in important liturgical work, having served as secretary to the Liturgical Committee of the Church of the Province of South Africa from 1931 to 1950. The 'South African liturgy' – the Prayer Books of 1924 and 1954 – were widely acknowledged as amongst the "most satisfactory" in the Anglican Communion.

== Notes ==
Anglican Church of Southern Africa titles
Preceded by Wilfrid Gore Browne	Bishop of Kimberley and Kuruman; 1928–1943	Succeeded by John Hunter
Preceded by Edward Etheridge	Bishop of St John's; 1943–1951	Succeeded by St John Evans
