= Harriet Mason =

Botanical illustrator, plant collector, poor-law inspector, author

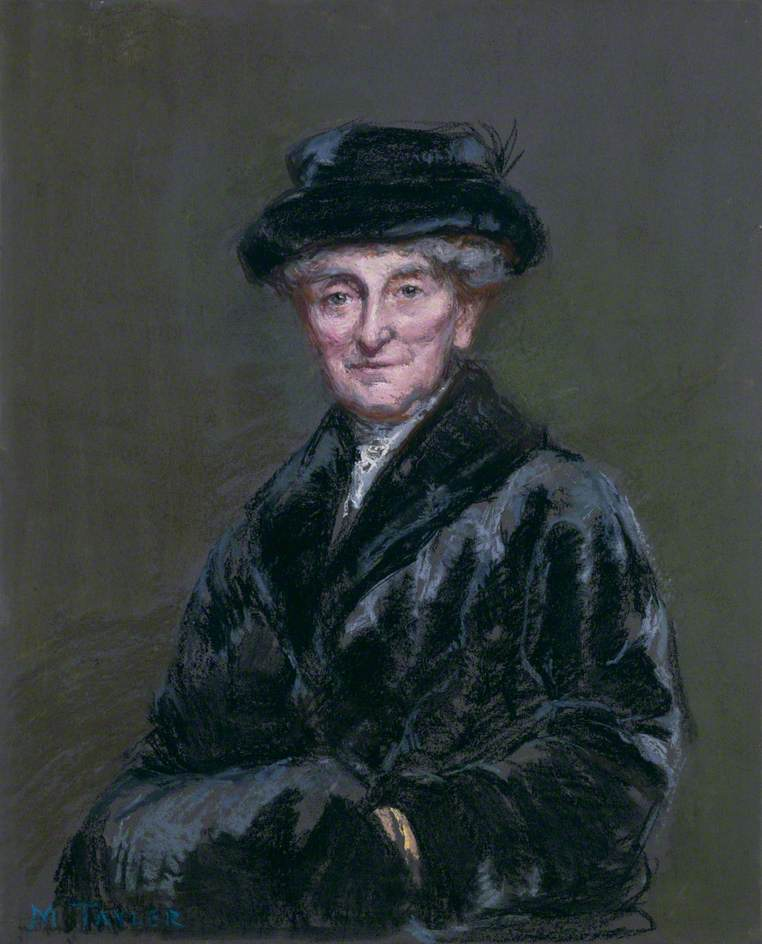
- by Minna Taylor in 1921
- Born: 19 February 1845; Marylebone
- Died: 7 April 1932 (aged 87); Rondebosch
- Occupation: poor-law inspector
- Known for: botanical illustration

Harriet Mason or Marianne Harriet Mason; Marianne H. Mason (19 February 1845 – 7 April 1932) was a song collector, botanical illustrator, plant collector, poor-law inspector, author.

== Life ==
Mason was born in Marylebone in 1845. She was the daughter of George William and Marianne Mason of Morton Hall near Ranby in Nottinghamshire. Her brother Arthur James Mason was a professor at Cambridge and her sister Agnes became a nun and founded the Community of the Holy Family. Another brother George Edward Mason was the rector at Whitwell and later principal of St Bede's College, Umtata, an Anglican theological college in the Transkei, South Africa.

At the age of four her family moved to Carmarthenshire. She heard songs there in Wales at Laugharne. In 1877 she was one of the first people to collect, record and publish traditional folk songs. Her book was called "Nursery Rhymes and Country Songs" and was intended for entertainment around the piano. Her book is said to have started a folk song revival. She was known to the folk song collectors Sabine Baring-Gould and Lucy Broadwood.

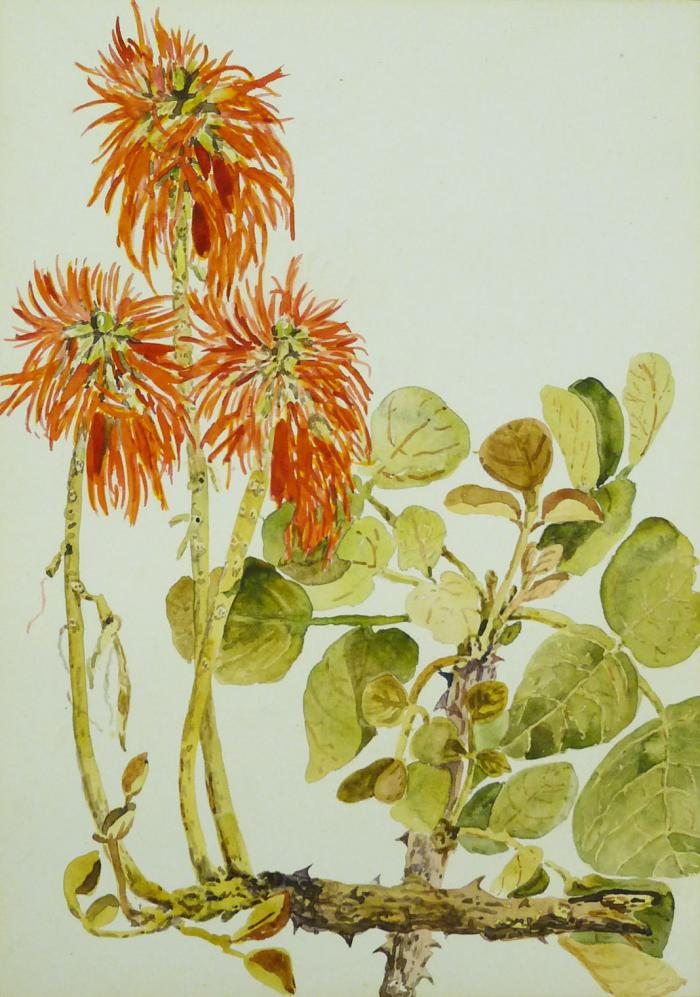
Erythrina (one of hundreds of her watercolours at Kew)

Mason volunteered for many years before she was forty when she was offered paid work. This led to her becoming the first woman inspector of "boarded out" (fostered) children. She was known for thoroughness. She was promoted in 1898 to a more senior position until she retired in 1910.

After she retired she went to see her brother, Canon Edward Mason, at St Bede's College, Umtata in South Africa where she indulged her interest in painting flowers. In 1913 she published Some flowers of eastern and central Africa and she was elected to Royal Geographical Society. Mason had houses in England and South Africa. She and her brother travelled widely and she visited Southern Rhodesia and Uganda.

Mason died at her home in Rondebosch in 1932. She left her plant collections to Kew Gardens. She had three plants named after her:

- Indigofera masoniae,
- Watsonia masoniae, and
- Crocosmia masoniae.
