= Paul Mason (diplomat) =

British diplomat (1904–1978)

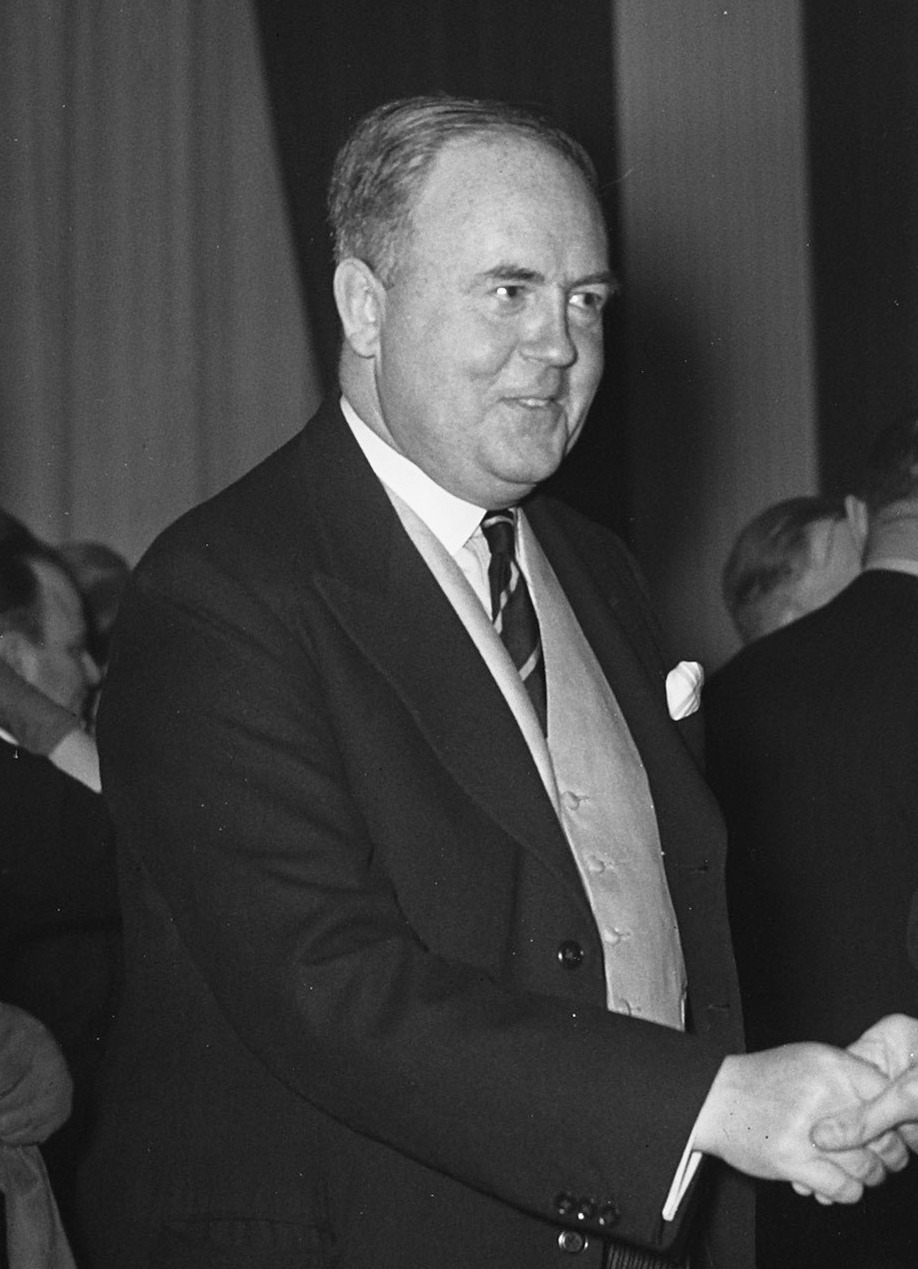
Paul Mason in 1954

Sir Paul Mason (11 June 1904 – 14 May 1978) was a British diplomat, ambassador to the Netherlands from 1954 to 1960 and the British Permanent Representative to the North Atlantic Council from 1960 to 1962.

== Education ==
The son of Arthur James Mason, he was educated at Eton College and King's College, Cambridge, taking a first class honours degree in Modern History in 1926.

== Career ==
Joining the Foreign Service in 1928, Mason had overseas postings to Brussels, Sofia, Prague, Ottawa, and Lisbon and also home posts at the Foreign Office in London. He was assistant private secretary to the Foreign Secretary 1934–1936. Mason was private secretary to the Parliamentary Under Secretary of State 1936–1937. He was an acting Counsellor in 1945. He was the British Minister at Sofia 1949–1951.

Mason was recalled to London as assistant Under Secretary of State at the Foreign Office from 1951 to 1954. He was British Ambassador to the Netherlands 1954–1960. He was Permanent Representative on the North Atlantic Council 1960–1962.

Mason was Alternate Delegate to the Minister of State in the Geneva Delegation on Disarmament and Nuclear Tests 1962–1964.

In retirement, Mason was High Sheriff of Nottinghamshire for 1970 and Treasurer of the University of Nottingham from 1972 until his death.

== Family ==
In 1938 he married Roberta, daughter J. Lorn McDougall KC, of Ottawa, and they had one son and one daughter. At the time of his death his address was Morton Hall, Retford, Nottinghamshire, the family seat. He was a member of the Lansdowne Club.

== Honours ==
- Chevalier of the Order of Leopold
- Grand Cordon of the Order of the House of Orange, 1958
