= Joseph W. Williams =

Joseph Watkin Williams (1857 – 1934) was the third Bishop of St John's in what was then known as Kaffraria and is now the Anglican Diocese of Mthatha.

Williams was educated at Winchester College and New College, Oxford, he was ordained deacon in 1881 and priest two year later. He emigrated to South Africa in 1894 and was Acting Rector of St Saviour, Claremont until 1898, when he was appointed Vicar general of Saint Helena. After a further three years he was elevated to the episcopate. After twenty-one years service he retired to the Cape of Good Hope area and died on 18 December 1934.

== Notes ==
Anglican Church of Southern Africa titles
Preceded by Bransby Key	Bishop of St John's; 1901 – 1922	Succeeded by Edward Etheridge
