= Saju Muthalaly =

Indian-British Anglican bishop

The Right Reverend Saju Muthalaly
- Bishop of Loughborough
- Church: Church of England
- Diocese: Diocese of Leicester
- In office: 2022 to present
- Other post: Assistant Bishop of Coventry (November 2023–present)

Orders
- Ordination: 2008 (deacon); 2009 (priest)
- Consecration: 25 January 2022 by Justin Welby

Personal details
- Born: Varghese Malayil Lukose Muthalaly; 1979 (age 46–47) South India
- Denomination: Anglicanism
- Spouse: Katy
- Children: Four
- Education: Southern Asia Bible College, Bangalore; Wycliffe Hall, Oxford

Varghese Malayil Lukose "Saju" Muthalaly (born 1979) is an Indian-British Anglican bishop. Since 2022, he has been the Bishop of Loughborough, a suffragan bishop in the Church of England's Diocese of Leicester.

== Early life and education ==
Muthalaly was born in 1979 in South India. He grew up in a leprosy hospital in Bangalore, where his mother was a nurse. His family were part of the Malankara Orthodox Syrian Church, and he "committed his life to Christ" as a teenager. He studied at the Southern Asia Bible College in Bangalore, graduating with a Bachelor of Theology (BTh) degree in 2001. Having moved to the United Kingdom in 2001, he trained for ordination at Wycliffe Hall, Oxford, an evangelical Anglican theological college, and graduated from the University of Oxford with a further BTh in 2008.

== Ordained ministry ==
Muthalaly was ordained in the Church of England as a deacon in 2008 and as a priest in 2009. From 2008 to 2011, he served his curacy at St Thomas' Church, Lancaster, a charismatic evangelical church in the Diocese of Blackburn. He then moved to the Diocese of Carlisle, where he was an associate vicar at St Thomas' Church, Kendal and St Catherine's Church, Crook from 2011 to 2015. In 2015, he joined St Mark's Church, Gillingham and St Mary's Island in the Diocese of Rochester as priest in charge. He was made vicar of St Mark's Gillingham in 2019.

On 12 November 2021, it was announced that Muthalaly had been appointed the next Bishop of Loughborough, the suffragan bishop of the Diocese of Leicester, in succession to Guli Francis-Dehqani. He was consecrated a bishop by Justin Welby, Archbishop of Canterbury, on 25 January 2022 at St Paul's Cathedral; reportedly becoming the youngest bishop in the Church of England. On 9 November 2023, he also became part-time Assistant Bishop of Coventry during the coinciding vacancies in the diocesan See and the See of Warwick; in that role, he assists Ruth Worsley (Acting Bishop of Coventry) one day a week.

== Personal life ==
Muthalaly is married to Katy; together they have four children. In his spare time, he is a keen cricketer and has represented the Canterbury & Rochester (Rocherbury) Diocesan team and West Farleigh CC where he has shone as a big hitting all-rounder. He captained the Diocesan team to the Semi Finals of the Church Times Cup in 2017.
