= HM Prison Ranby =

Prison in Nottinghamshire, England

Coordinates: 53.3214°N 0.9982°W

HMP Ranby
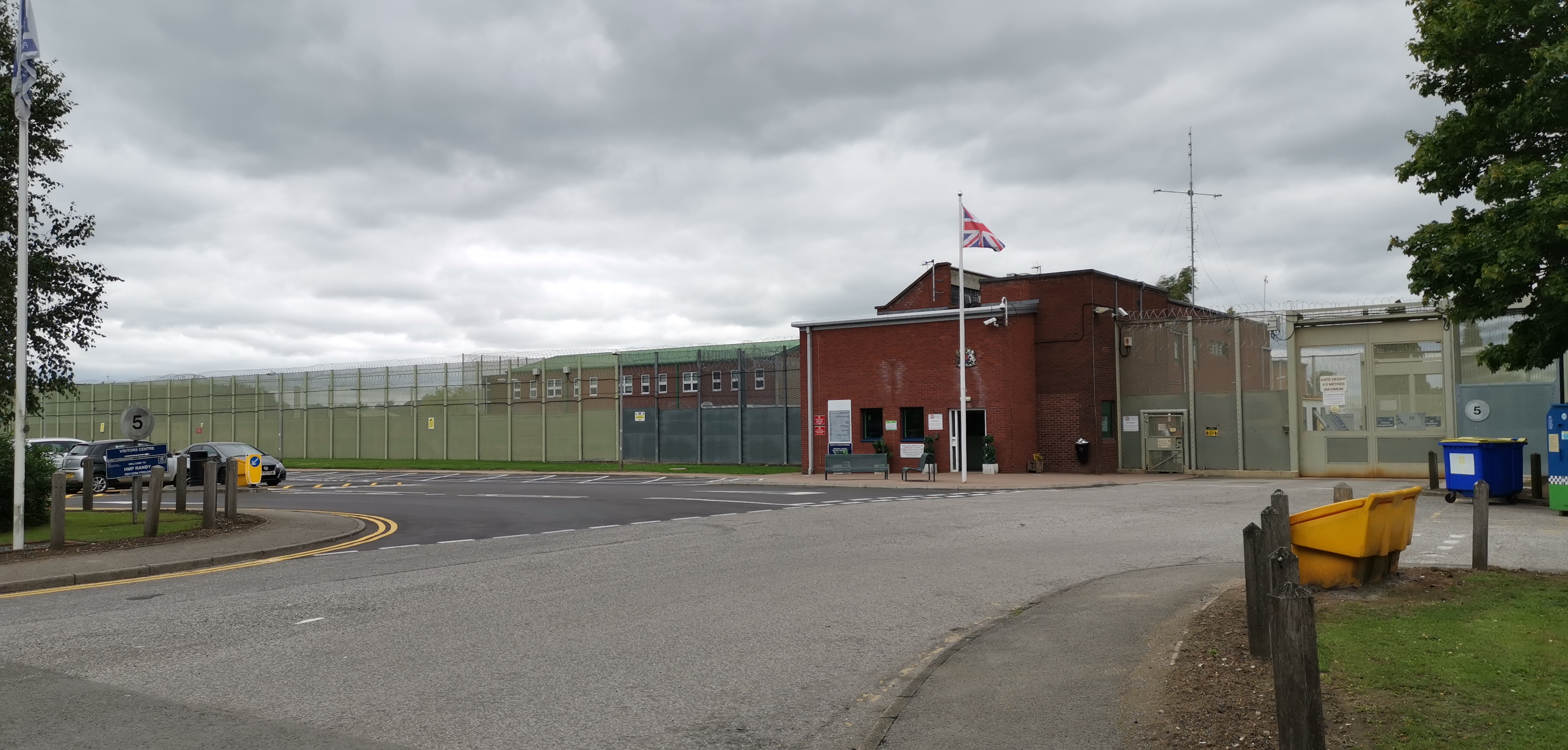
- Entrance to HM Prison Ranby
- Interactive map of HMP Ranby
- Location: Ranby, Nottinghamshire
- Security class: Adult Male/Category C
- Population: 1034 (February 2017)
- Opened: 1972
- Managed by: HM Prison Services
- Governor: Angie Petit
- Website: Ranby at justice.gov.uk

HM Prison Ranby is a Category C men's prison, located in the village of Ranby in Nottinghamshire, England. The prison is operated by His Majesty's Prison Service. It holds about 1000 male prisoners.

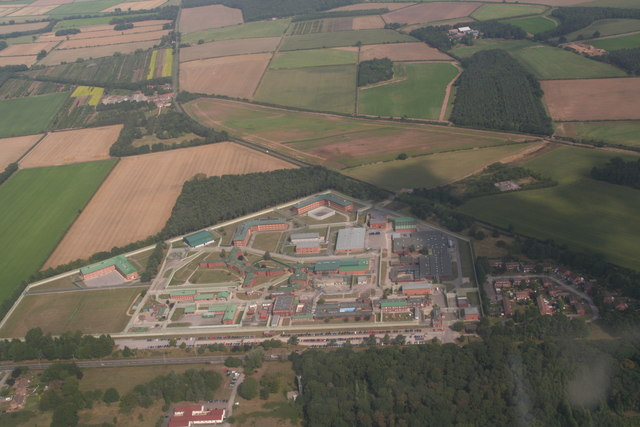
Aerial photograph taken in 2013

== History ==
Ranby was converted in the early 1970s from its original use as a World War II British Army camp. Some of the army billet accommodation remains at the prison today. Some purpose built accommodation was added to the complex in 1980s, and two further wings were opened in February 1996. Two more wings of the prison were opened in Summer 1998, and a further wing was opened in March 2008, with capacity for an extra 60 prisoners.

The prison has been criticized for its conditions: in 2002, a study by the Prison Reform Trust found that prisoners were not always offered privacy from their cell mates while using the toilets, which they labelled as "degrading". Two years later, the Independent Monitoring Board stated that the Prison was overcrowded and had problems with safety standards. The Board reported that vulnerable prisoners' safety in particular was being put at risk, especially at night, while also praising the prison for its work in education, physical education and chaplaincy. In 2005 the Board called for a new wing to replace the oldest part of the prison. A 2007 inspection report from His Majesty's Chief Inspector of Prisons raised concerns about security and drug use at Ranby Prison. The report also criticised the prison's anti-bullying programmes, accommodation and resettlement work. A further report in 2012 noted strengths is staff-prisoner relations, resettlement, vocational training and work environment for prisoners, but concerns about that a quarter of prisoners were locked in their cells, the availability of debt and financial advice services, a number of unscreened toilets, insufficient efforts to reduce violence and self-harm, and high levels of drug and alcohol availability. They were also concerned about the health care provision.

== Prison accommodations ==
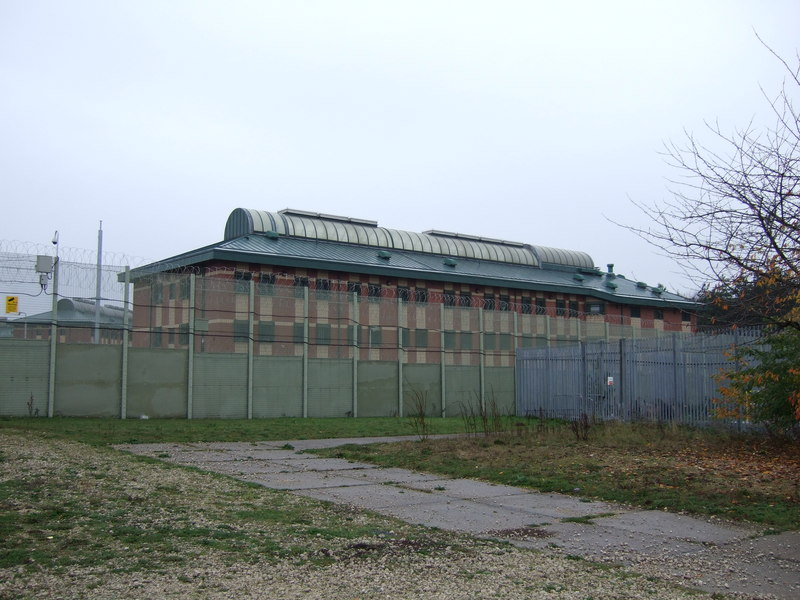
Prison building viewed from Old London Road in 2011

Ranby is a Category C training prison for sentenced adult males. Accommodation at the prison is divided between 7 wings:

House block 1: 248 prisoners. North: induction wing; South: Resettlement wing - Prisoners vary on this wing between 16 weeks to 1 week left on their sentence.

House block 2: 244 prisoners. North: a general wing; South: the drug intervention and drug recovery unit

House block 3: 237 prisoners with various sentences

House block 4: 60 prisoners; For enhanced prisoners only

House block 5: 192 prisoners with various sentences; eight spurs with 24 cells on each spur - For enhanced prisoners only; however some inmates move to this wing and automatically become enhanced.

House blocks 6: 60 prisoners with various sentences - For enhanced prisoners only; however some inmates move to this wing and automatically become enhanced.

House Block 7: 60 prisoners with various sentences - For enhanced prisoners only; however some inmates move to this wing and automatically become enhanced.

HMP Ranby provides various areas of work.

It has 16 functional workshops varying from Textiles (Making T-Shirts) to Powder Coating.

Education at Ranby consists of 15+ courses that inmates can take part on. Ranging from Business Level 3 to Arts and independent living skills etc.

== Regime ==
HMP Ranby operates as of 2022 on a Line route system for the Regime. Line route means all houseblock main gates are opened and gates on the "Route" to work or education are opened with staff stationed at various points on the route to allow free flow to work or education.

All house block regimes are based on "Fence Side" and "Yard Side" meaning which cells face which direction get unlocked. For example, all inmates with cell windows facing the "Fence Side" are unlocked at 8.15am Monday to Friday to go on "Line Route" to work or education whereas "Yard Side" is unlocked at 9am till 11am for associate period. "Yard Side" goes to work at 1.30pm on line route and "Fence Side" is unlocked at 2pm for association period.

This changes each week rotating on the times for each houseblock. For example, week 1 Fence Side goes to work in the morning and week 2 they go to work in the afternoon.

Generally prisoners are given food at 11am and 4pm, however this is heavily dependent on each houseblock and how quickly prisoners in the servery get the food ready.

== Notable former inmates ==
- Michael Carroll
- Luke McCormick
- Martin Hall-Adams
- Luke Foster
