= Jacob Dlamini (bishop) =

Jacob Zambuhle Bhekuyise Dlamini was the last Bishop of St John's to hold that title throughout his episcopate. He studied for the priesthood at St Bede’s College Umtata and was ordained deacon in 1961 and priest two years later. He began his career with posts within the Diocese of Zululand before becoming Archdeacon of Empangeni. In 1985 he was elevated to the episcopate and made important changes, notably in 1991 the creation of a new diocese (Umzimvubu) within part of St John's. A committed evangelist he retired in 2000, shortly after chairing a synod on the church leadership's social responsibility to the underprivileged.

== Notes ==
Anglican Church of Southern Africa titles
| Preceded by Godfrey Ashby | Bishop of St John's; 1985 – 2000 | Succeeded by Sitembele Tobela Mzamane |
