= Bransby Key =

Anglican bishop

Bransby Lewis Key (1838–1901) was the 2nd bishop of St John's in what was then known as Kaffraria and is now Mthatha, South Africa. Born into a medical family he was educated at Kensington Grammar School and St Augustine's College, Canterbury. Ordained deacon in 1864 and priest a year later, his first post was as a missionary in the Transkei. After 19 years he was appointed coadjutor bishop of the diocese, and four years later (when Bishop Callaway retired) took full control of the see.

== Famiy ==
Bransby Lewis Key married Georgina Annie Waters (daughter of Rev. H. J. Waters) in October 1868 at St John's Mission Station. They had seven children:

- Annie Katherine Key born on 29 August 1869, died 5 September 1869;
- Alice Mary Key born 15 April 1871, married William Allerton Goodwin on 3 July 1890, St John's Cathedral;
- Henry Aston Key born 8 July 1873, married Marguerite Isabel Hickman on 1 September 1904, St Peter's Cathedral;
- Mina Julia Key born on 6 October 1875, married Caleb George Warner Atkinson on 19 June 1900, St Johns Cathedral;
- Edmund Bransby Key born on 11 May 1878;
- Evelyn Margaret Key - date of birth unknown;
- Ellen Georgina Key - date of birth unknown.

Key was related to English-Canadian priest Edmund Wood, the founder of the Church of St. John the Evangelist in Montreal, Canada's first Anglo-Catholic parish.

Anglican Church of Southern Africa titles
Preceded by Henry Callaway	Bishop of St John's; 1897 – 1901	Succeeded by Joseph Williams
