= Phumzile Cetywayo =

Anglican Bishop of Umzimvubu

Phumzile Cetywayo is the current Anglican Bishop of Umzimvubu.

Anglican Church of Southern Africa titles
Preceded by Tsietsi Seleoane	Bishop of Umzimvubu; 2024 –	Incumbent
