= Tsietsi Seleoane =

Tsietsi Seleoane is a South African Anglican bishop: he served as a suffragan bishop in the Diocese of Natal from 2011 to 2019; and was elected as bishop of Umzimvubu in September 2019. He was installed as the bishop of Umzimvubu on 1 February 2019.

Seleoane was born in Herschel, Eastern Cape and was ordained a deacon in 1996 and as a priest in 1997. He has held incumbencies in Drakensberg, Dundee, KwaZulu-Natal and Newcastle, KwaZulu-Natal

Anglican Church of Southern Africa titles
Preceded by Mlibo Ngewu	Bishop of Umzimvubu; 2019 – 2024	Succeeded by Phumzile Cetywayo
