= St John's Cathedral, Mthatha =

Building in South Africa

Coordinates: 31°35′33″S 28°47′20″E

- The Cathedral Church of St John the Evangelist
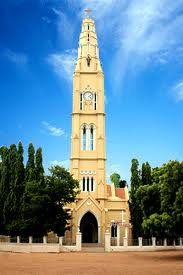
- St John's Cathedral, Mthatha
- Country: South Africa
- Denomination: Anglican
- Website: https://www.anglicanmthatha.org.za/

History
- Founded: 1872
- Consecrated: 16 December 16th, 1901

Architecture
- Architect(s): George Fellowes Prynne; Leonard William Barnard; William Maynard Shaw
- Years built: 1901-1905

Administration
- Diocese: Anglican Diocese of Mthatha

St John's Cathedral (The Cathedral Church of St John the Evangelist) is the Anglican cathedral in Mthatha (King Sabata Dalindyebo Local Municipality), South Africa. It is the seat of the Bishop of the Anglican Diocese of Mthatha.

== History ==
In 1897, at the behest of Bishop Bransby Key, a committee was struck, and resolved to find a site for a new cathedral. The diocese, then the Diocese of St John’s, had been the recipient of part of the Marriott Bequest, a large sum of money left to the Church of England by the wealthy Yorkshire mill owner Alfred Marriott for the "propagation of the Gospel in Foreign Parts".

The committee, which included local clergymen and church officers, and representatives from the several parishes within the diocese, resolved to hire the English ecclesiastic architect George Fellowes Prynne, known for building grand churches, to prepare the plans for a 400-seat church, for which £5,000 was budgeted. The committee also hired a Scotsman named George Home as Clerk of Works. Home arrived in the summer of 1899 but, as Prynne's plans had yet to be received, Home was put to work building the girls' school St Cuthbert's Mission in nearby Tsolo.

In 1900, the Bishop traveled to England and met with Prynne. He saw the plans for the church and reported that it was doubtful that they could be carried out. Prynne had designed an impressive cathedral, a cruciform with a 36' x 147' nave, divided into 7 bays, and a 30' x 67' chancel, with the north and south transepts accommodating 189 and 146 people respectively. In 1901, the plans for the eastern portion of the cathedral were received and it was found that they were of such an elaborate nature that construction of the eastern portion alone would cost £30,000.

The Marriott bequest was £1000, and it stipulated that construction had to begin before the close of 1901, so the committee resolved to build the western portion of the church, despite the fact that the working drawings for that portion had yet to be received. Home was instructed to proceed at his own discretion. On December 16th, 1901, the foundation was laid by Bishop Joseph W. Williams.

Work proceeded on the western portion, still without plans. In 1902, Home's health failed, he had to leave the project and work was suspended. Bishop Williams traveled to England and pressured Prynne, who sent the plans for the west end. He also sent his invoice. He had quoted £900 and billed the diocese £1200. After the committee brought legal action, Prynne reduced the claim to his quote.

In 1904, the committee hired architect Leonard William Barnard, who redesigned the cathedral's western portion so that the total cost would be £7,000. William Maynard Shaw (1842-1918), an English Cowley Fathers lay brother then living at St. Cuthbert's, was the consulting architect who, with Barnard, supervised construction.

The committee worked to raise funds for the cathedral throughout the process. The Scottish Episcopal Church Bishop of Glasgow and Galloway Ean Campbell donated £1,100. This still left the building fund in debt to the amount of £1,200. As a result, only the nave was completed; that is now the cathedral of St John the Evangelist.
