= James Schuster =

English bishop

James Leo Schuster (1912–2006) was the long-serving 7th bishop of St John's in what was then known as Kaffraria and is now Mthatha. He was also the Dean of the Church of the Province of Southern Africa, now Anglican Church of Southern Africa — the most senior bishop next to the Archbishop of Cape Town. Educated at Lancing College and Keble College, Oxford, he was ordained in 1937. Assistant missioner at Rotherhithe until 1938, he was subsequently chaplain at St Stephen's House, Oxford, and then served in the Second World War as a chaplain to the Forces. In 1949 he was appointed principal of St Bede's College, Umtata, before his ordination to the episcopate in 1956. In retirement he was archdeacon of Riversdale. He died after a long retirement in 2006.

== Notes ==
Anglican Church of Southern Africa titles
| Preceded by St John Evans | Bishop of St John's; 1956 – 1980 | Succeeded by Godfrey Ashby |
