= Joe Mzamane =

South African Priest

- Born: Joshua Bernard Mbizo Mzamane; 10 January 1918; Ngxaza, Tsolo
- Died: 13 December 1993 (aged 75)
- Occupations: Priest, Mayor
- Children: Mbulelo Mzamane
- Relatives: Joab Mzamane

Joshua Bernard Mbizo Mzamane; 10 January 1918 – 13 December 1993 was an Anglican priest in the Anglican Diocese of Johannesburg and a human rights activist.

== Life and work ==
Joe was born in Ngxaza, Tsolo, Eastern Cape in 1918. His mother was Martha Mzizi and his father was Shadrach Mzamane who was an Anglican voluntary preacher.

Joe did his primary school at St. Cuthberts Mission, Tsolo. He obtained a Diploma in Theology from St Peters College Rosettenville and was the rector of St. Barnabas Church, KwaThema from 1962-1982. He was also the National and Regional President of the Interdenominational African Minister's Association (IDAMASA). He was also the mayor of KwaThema during the apartheid era. The Joe Mzamane street in kwaThema was named after him. Joe Mzamane is Joab Mzamane's brother, Mbulelo Mzamane's father and Bishop Sitembele Mzamane's uncle.
