= Arthur James Mason =

English clergyman, theologian and classical scholar

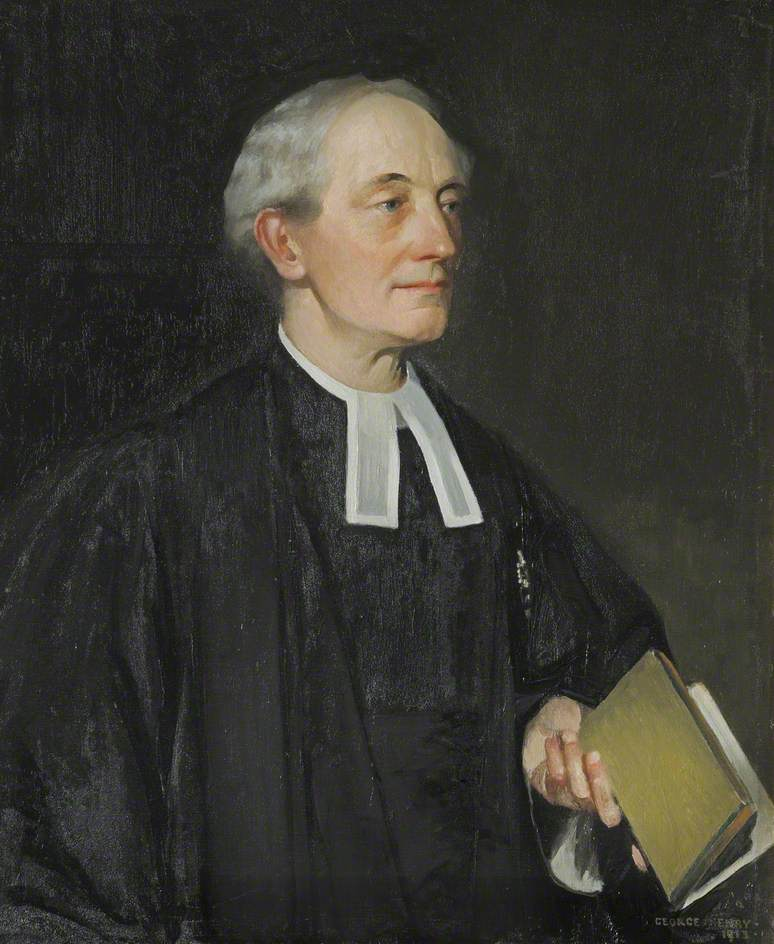
Arthur James Mason, 1913 portrait

Arthur James Mason (4 May 1851 – 24 April 1928) was an English clergyman, theologian and classical scholar. He was Lady Margaret's Professor of Divinity, Master of Pembroke College, Cambridge, and Vice-Chancellor of the University of Cambridge.

== Early life ==
The third son of George William Mason JP, of Morton Hall, Retford, Nottinghamshire, by his marriage to Marianne Atherton Mitford (born 1821 in India), a daughter of Captain Joseph George Mitford (1791–1875), of the Madras Army, Mason was educated at Repton School and Trinity College, Cambridge. The third of four sons, his youngest brother, Charles Evelyn Mason, was killed in the Zulu War of 1879. His brother William Henry Mason was a High Sheriff of Nottinghamshire. His sister, Harriet, was a poor law inspector and another sister, Agnes founded a religious community. Their grandfather, J. G. Mitford, was the son of Bertram Mitford (1748–1800) of Mitford Castle in Northumberland.

== Career ==
Mason was elected a fellow of Trinity College in 1873 and was a college tutor from 1874 to 1877, when he went to Cornwall as Canon of Truro. His departure from Cambridge was at the urging of his friend Edward White Benson, who had been appointed as Bishop of Truro and wanted Mason to act as diocesan missioner.

In 1884, after Benson had been translated to Canterbury, Mason took up a benefice as vicar of All Hallows-by-the-Tower, Barking, in the City of London, where he remained until 1895. That year he returned to Cambridge as Lady Margaret's Professor of Divinity (1895–1903) and also became a canon of Canterbury Cathedral. He was a fellow of Jesus from 1896 to 1903, before serving as master of Pembroke from 1903 to 1912. In 1908 he was elected vice-chancellor of the university, continuing in the post for two years.

As well as works on theology and biography, Mason wrote and translated hymns. As "A. J. M.", he was a contributor to the Dictionary of National Biography.

== Private life ==
On 11 January 1899, Mason married Mary Margaret, a daughter of the Rev. G. J. Blore DD, honorary canon of Canterbury Cathedral and a former head master of King's School, Canterbury. They had two sons, Paul and Lancelot, and a daughter, Mildred. Paul became a diplomat and was ambassador to the Netherlands in the 1950s, while Lancelot followed his father into the church and was archdeacon of Chichester from 1946 to 1973.

Arthur James Mason died at Canterbury on 24 April 1928.

== Major publications ==
- The Persecution of Diocletian, 1875
- Commentary on Thessalonians and First Epistle of St Peter, 1879
- The faith of the Gospel: a manual of Christian doctrine, 1887
- The Relation of Confirmation to Baptism: as taught in Holy Scripture and the Fathers, 1893
- The Conditions of our Lord's Life upon Earth, 1896
- Thomas Cranmer, 1898
- Purgatory: The State of the Faithful Departed; Invocation of Saints (Hulsean Lecture for 1899)
- The Historic Martyrs of the Primitive Church, 1905
- Memoir of Bishop Wilkinson, 1909
- Life of William Edward Collins, Bishop of Gibraltar, 1912
- The Church of England and Episcopacy, 1914
- What Became of the Bones of St Thomas, 1920
- Fifty Spiritual Homilies of St. Macarius the Egyptian, 1921
- Five Theological Orations of Gregory of Nazianzus (ed.)
- History of the Papacy in the 19th Century, by Bishop Nielsen (ed.)

== Notes ==
Academic offices
Preceded by J. Rawson Lumby	Lady Margaret's Professor of Divinity; 1895–1903	Succeeded by Alexander Kirkpatrick
Preceded by Ernest Stewart Roberts	Vice-Chancellor of the University of Cambridge; 1908–1910	Succeeded by Robert Forsyth Scott
