= Mbulelo Mzamane =

South African author, poet and academic

Mbulelo Vizikhungo Mzamane
- Born: 28 July 1948; Port Elizabeth, Eastern Cape, South Africa
- Died: 16 February 2014 (aged 65)
- Children: Nomvuyo Mzamane * Thamsanqa * Nonkosi
- Writing career
- Notable works: A Trilogy: –The Children of Soweto, –The Children of the Diaspora and Other Stories of Exile, –Where There Is No Vision the People Perish: Reflections on the African Renaissance; Also, Mzala, My Cousin Comes to Jo'burg and The Race Between the Turtles and Cheetahs (children's book)
- Website: www.mbulelomzamane.tumblr.com

Mbulelo Vizikhungo Mzamane (28 July 1948 – 16 February 2014) was a South African author, poet, and academic. He was described by the late President Nelson Mandela as a "visionary leader and one of South Africa’s greatest intellectuals".

== Early life ==
Mbulelo was born in Port Elizabeth, and grew up first in Soweto and then in the Brakpan-Springs area. His mother Flamma Cingashe Nkonyeni was a nurse and his father Canon Joshua Bernard Mbizo Mzamane was an Anglican priest; both were community leaders. His early schooling was in Soweto, and he later attended high school at St. Christopher's in Swaziland, where he was taught by distinguished writer and journalist Can Themba.

== Education and Work ==
Mbulelo did his undergraduate education at the then University of Botswana, Lesotho and Swaziland (UBLS, Roma Campus), obtaining dual degrees in English and Philosophy and a Certificate in education cum laude. He also obtained an M.A. in English from UBLS.

He taught at Mabathoana High School in Lesotho before moving to Botswana, from where he was later expelled for political activism. He obtained his PhD in English Literature from the University of Sheffield, England.

He held various academic positions in Lesotho, Botswana, England, Nigeria, USA, Germany, Australia and South Africa. In 1976 he was the first recipient of the Mofolo-Plomer Prize for Literature.

In 2012 he was the recipient of the African Literature Association's Lifetime Achievement Award, The Fonlon-Nicholls Award, for creative writing, scholarship and human rights advocacy.

Mbulelo is also widely known as a writer of fiction and poetry, and his collections of short stories are especially noteworthy. Much of his fiction work was written while in exile and subsequently banned in apartheid South Africa.

On 16 February 2014, he died at the age of 65.

== Activism and exile ==
Mbulelo was an activist against the apartheid government of South Africa. He spent many years in exile in Nigeria and the USA and spread South African literature there and conscientious people on the South African struggle.

== Return to South Africa ==
Mbulelo returned to South Africa in 1993 and in 1994 he became the first post-apartheid Vice Chancellor and Rector of the University of Fort Hare, where he also held the faculty rank of Professor in the Department of English Studies and Comparative Literature. After leaving the University of Fort Hare, he was a vocal contributor to international debate on issues confronting African populations on the continent and in the diaspora of the Americas.

Mbulelo chaired and served on numerous boards, including: the African Arts Fund (affiliated to the U.N. Center against Apartheid) and the Institute for the Advancement of Journalism (affiliated to the University of the Witwatersrand). Mbulelo was also the director of the Center for African Literary Studies, University of KwaZulu-Natal (UKZN).

He worked closely with Ngugi Wa Thiong’o and Nawal El Saadawi as co-chairs of BUWA! African Languages and Literatures into the 21st Century.

He was appointed by both former presidents Nelson Mandela and Thabo Mbeki into various advisory boards. He was also involved with some aspects of the National Development Plan. In June 2013 Mbulelo was the guest speaker at the inaugural Can Themba Memorial Lecture alongside Nadine Gordimer and Joe Thloloe.

He was the Project Leader and General Editor of the Encyclopaedia of South African Arts Culture and Heritage (ESAACH).

== Published collections ==
Mbulelo was a popular personality on the international speaking scene and some of his works have been translated into several languages including German, French, Russian, Dutch and Slavic. His publications include:

- Mzala: The Short Stories of Mbulelo Mzamane (Johannesburg: Ravan Press, 1980).
- My Cousin Comes to Jo'burg (Harlow: Longman, 1981).
- The Children of Soweto: A Trilogy (Harlow: Longman, 1982).
- The Children of the Diaspora and Other Stories of Exile (Western Cape: Vivlia Publishers, 1996).
- Where There Is No Vision the People Perish: Reflections on the African Renaissance (University of South Australia: Hawke Institute, 2001).
- The Race Between the Turtles and Cheetahs (Children's Book) (Canberra, The Australian National University: The Herbert and Valmae Freilich Foundation, 2004).
- Children of Paradise (UKZN Press, 2011).
- Of Minks and Men and Other Stories of Our Transition and The Mbeki Turn: South Africa after Mandela (Lambert Academic Publishing, 2013).
