= Sitembele Mzamane =

South African Anglican bishop (born 1952)

The Right Reverend Dr Sitembele Mzamane
- Bishop of Mthatha
- Church: Anglican
- See: Anglican Diocese of Mthatha previous Diocese of St John's
- In office: 2000–2017
- Predecessor: Jacob Zambuhle Bhekuyise Dlamini
- Successor: Nkosinathi Ndwandwe
- Previous post: Dean of St John's Cathedral, Mthatha

Orders
- Ordination: 1975 by James Leo Schuster
- Consecration: August 2000 by Njongonkulu Ndungane

Personal details
- Born: 30 January 1952
- Spouse: Hazel Thobeka Mzamane (nee Gobingca)
- Children: Sibongiseni * Nangamso * Batwa * Notabizolo * Sisonke*
- Education: PhD in Theology
- Alma mater: University of the Free State, University of Pretoria

Sitembele Tobela Mzamane (born 30 January 1952) is a South African Anglican bishop. He is a former Bishop of Mthatha, and Dean of the Province of the Anglican Church of Southern Africa— the most senior bishop next to the Archbishop of Cape Town. Although he is the first bishop to bear that title, he is the 10th incumbent, since the bishopric was previously known as St John's.

== Early life ==
Sitembele was born in Ngxaza, Tsolo, Transkei in 1952. His mother was Cynthia Sylvia Nozipho Mzamane (née Dlwati) and his father Joab Cornelius Mhlangenqaba Mzamane who was an agriculturalist. Sitembele married Hazel Thobeka Mzamane(late) (née Gobingca) in 1976. His grand father Shadrach Mzamane was also an Anglican lay preacher in the Ngcele area. Sitembele completed his secondary education at St John's College in Mthatha.

== Joining the clergy ==
After receiving a Diploma in Theology from St. Bede's College in Mthatha.

Sitembele at St Bedes, third row, 2nd from Right

Sitembele was ordained to the diaconate in December 1975 and served at St Andrew's in Mthatha.

Sitembele as a deacon

He was ordained into the Priesthood in December 1977.

== Church ministry ==
While Priest in Charge of St. Barnabas Manzana, he completed a Bachelor of Theology degree from the University of South Africa. In 1988 he was appointed rector of St. Peter's, Butterworth, Eastern Cape and archdeacon and served in that position for two years before being appointed dean of St John's Cathedral, Mthatha.

While serving as dean, he completed an honours BA from the University of the Free State (graduating cum laude), an MA from the University of the Free State, and a PhD from the University of Pretoria.

In 2000, Sitembele was elected bishop of the Diocese of St. John's.

Sitembele with Rowan Williams, Archbishop of Canterbury at Lambeth Conference

During his episcopacy the number of parishes grew so greatly that Mzamane drafted plans to split the area with a new episcopal see centred at Ngcobo.

Sitembele with Thabo Makgoba, Archbishop of Cape Town

The new Diocese of Mbhashe was established on 16 December 2010 out of part of the Diocese of Mthatha.

== Views ==
A former Dean of the diocese's cathedral Mzamane subscribes to the orthodox Anglican stance on homosexuality, and is opposed to the blessing of same-sex relationships.

== Honours ==
In 2013 he received an honorary Doctor of Divinity degree, jure dignitatis from Huron University College.

== Notes ==
Anglican Church of Southern Africa titles
Preceded by Jacob Dlamini	Bishop of St John's; 2000–2006	Succeeded by Diocese name changed to Mthatha
Preceded by New name for former Diocese of St John's	Bishop of Mthatha; 2006–2017	Succeeded by Nkosinathi Ndwandwe
