= The Religious System of the Amazulu =

1870 book by Henry Callaway

The Religious System of The Amazulu
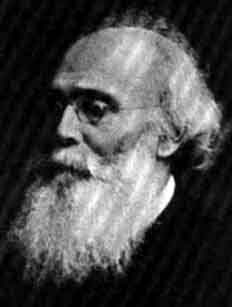
- This book tells about the tradition, culture and beliefs of the Zulu People in the 1800s.
- Author: Henry Callaway
- Language: English, and Zulu language
- Subject: Religion; Zulu People
- Genre: Non-Fiction
- Publication date: 1870
- Publication place: England

The Religious System of the Amazulu (1870), by Henry Callaway, describes the beliefs of the Amazulu people. It was written in both English and Zulu. Henry Callaway was an English missionary. His interest in the Zulu people began when he settled on the banks of the Nsunguze river where he created various books influenced by them. One of those books was The Religious Systems of The Amazulu. The book is presented in question and answer format. It is divided into four different sections which include, Unkulunkulu, Amatonga, Izinyanga Zokubula, and Abatakati. Each of these sections focuses on the four main aspects which constitute the religious system of the Zulu people.

In Crowds and Power, Elias Canetti wrote of The Religious System of the Amazulu, "It is among the essential documents of mankind."

== Biographical Background of Henry Callaway ==
=== Premissionary Work and Quakerism ===
Henry Callaway was the first missionary bishop of St. John's Kafraria in South Africa. He was born on January 17, 1817, at Lymington Somerset. After giving birth to Callaway, his family moved to London and then Crediton where he officially got educated in Crediton Grammar School. Callaway then went to become an assistant teacher in a small school in Heavitree. During his time at Heavitree, he was introduced to the idea of Quakerism by the headmaster of the school, William Dymond. He was prone to the idea of Quakerism and by the Spring of 1837, Henry Callaway was admitted to be the member of the Society of Friends, which is an official group for Quakers. He was admitted through a Quaker family that he privately tutored in Wellington. After his years in teaching, he decided to move into the medical field.

=== Anglican Church Missionary Work ===
After pursuing his career in the medical field, he found flaws in Quakerism which made him join the Anglican church. In 1854, he wrote to the bishop of Natal, John William Colenso, offering his service for missionary work. Callaway was then accepted on August 13 by the Society for the Propagation of the Gospel and ordained deacon at Norwich. He and his wife then left England on the 26th of August to South Africa where Callaway started his missionary work. After 4 years of doing his service, Callaway was granted land beyond the Umkomanzi river, he then settled at an empty Dutch farm on the Insunguze, which he named Spring Vale. From there, Callaway starts learning about the native's beliefs, traditions, and customs.

He also wanted to unravel the true meaning of Unkulunkulu as there were debates that circled around. Reverend Owen and George Champion stated that Unkulunkulu was a term referred to an Ancient Chief. The other American missionaries declined their idea and made the term Unkulunkulu as a suitable word for God. Callaway decided to do his own independent investigation and lead to making a different conclusion from Colenso and Bleek. Inspired by the ways of the Zulu people, he then published his work, The Religious System of the Amazulu.

== Summary of The Religious System of the Amazulu ==
The Religious System of the Amazulu is a nonfiction book that was written in a question and answer format. This book explains the beliefs, tradition, and culture of the Amazulu people. It is divided into 4 parts, the Unkulunkulu, Amathonga, Izinyanga Zokubhula, and Abathakathi. This book does not contain any sacred narratives, transcription of ceremonies or anything related to the sort. It contains primarily an explanation of concepts that Callaway was interested in. The Unkulunkulu focuses on the Unkulunkulu itself and the creation story from the perspective of the Zulu people. The Amathonga talks about the tradition of ancestral worship. The Izinyanga section focuses on traditional diviners. Lastly, the Zokubhula is about Zulu's medical magic and witchcraft remedy.

== Unkulunkulu ==
There had been many interpretations of the word Unkulunkulu. The American missionaries interpret this word as “God”. Reverend Owen and George Champion stated that the word is referred to Ancient Chief. From Callaway's independent investigation, he described that the term itself was challenging and enlightening. In 1870, he said that the Unkulunkulu was a word coined from the Gardiner, not the Zulu origins. He stated that the term Unkulunkulu expresses antiquity, age, the old-old one, the great-great-grandfather. AmuZulu people believe that Unkulunkulu was the first ancestor, a being who is neither immortal or eternal. Unkulunkulu is also known as the parents of all Zulu people. They believe that he was the one who taught them how to hunt, make fire, and grow food. Not only the Unkulunkulu, but the first men are also given other names which are Umvelinqangi and Uthlanga. These 3 words expressed different aspects of Unkulunkulu in Zulu's belief. The Amazulu people also believe in the existence of the Amathongo, who are the spirits of ancestors given by Unkulunkulu to guide the people.

== Amathongo ==
The Amathonga is the chapter that focuses on ancestral worship. The Zulu people believe that they possessed Amathongo ever since they were born. The Amathongo are the ones who will help guide them in their life. In every battle that the Zulu people face, they are assisted by Amathongo. Those who died during the battle will then be transformed into Amathongo. Those who survived were to follow a tradition, where they need to sacrifice cattle to the Amathongo. They will then need to pour the gall of their sacrifices to their body while saying “Let the Amathongo be bright and white and not dark that they may save us on another occasion”. This is how the Amazulu people will show their respect and gratitude to the Amathongo.

Callaway wrote that a man's Ithongo resembles him in character. The word Ithongo is a collective term for the inhabitants of the spirit world. There is an Ithongo that the Amazulu dreaded. He is the son of Unjikiza, the son of Ukucuba. He was a tall man with a huge muscular body. He was known to not act in accordance with the chief's law and acted after his own heart in villages that he had not been sent to. He was treating the people with disrespect, drinking their milk and eating their food without the consent of the owner. None of the villagers were brave enough to turn him in. The other Zulu people finally found out what he did and was killed with his 20 other men. The Zulu people stabbed him all over his body with their assagais. His Ithongo is never mentioned unless when any cattles are killed. If someone were to mention his name, the person would be silenced, for he might destroy the village.

== Izinyanga Zokubhula ==
The chapter of Izinyanga Zokubhula tells about the diviners. It focuses on ways a Zulu person can be the inyanga, the way a person begins their duty to become a diviner, the tasks of becoming a diviner, the story of the greatest Inyanga and Umwathaleni. When a man is ill, the Zulu people will enquire Umngoma; a more respectful way to call Izinyanga for Amazulu people. The Umngoma will then point out which doctor of medicine they should go to in order to heal the ill person. If the doctor cannot heal the disease, the doctor will ask the sick person to hear what other diviners say and they may tell the medicine to cure the person with.

For a normal person to become a diviner, Amathongo need to make the person ill. A lot of sacrificial goats will be needed in order for this person to become the diviner. The gallbladder of the killed goats will be dried and put on the man's hair. Afterwards, the person begins to be a diviner. The Amazulu people will then need to challenge the person in many ways to see if the person is a trustworthy diviner. Callaway discovered that one of the challenges could involve diving into a pool to find snakes. The diviner will need to come out of the water and entwine them and make sure that it still lives on the person's body.

== Abathakathi ==
The Abathakathi tells about medical magic and witchcraft of the Amazulu people. Abathakathi was left incomplete, one of the parts of the chapter talks about the strength of different medicine that the Amazulu people can use. There are special medicines for the chief which grant the chiefs strength and presence. Common men are not allowed to use or even touch this kind of medicine or they would be killed. This chapter also tells about the Chief's power, where the people would resist drinking out of the cup of a chief. The witchcraft part of this chapter is written in “The Magic of Ufaku” which tells the dialogue that Callaway had with Ufaku who is the great chief of Amampondo.

Intelezi is a primary element in the daily life of Amazulu people. They trust the intelezi very much as they keep bringing it most of the time when they want to wash. There are several different types of plants which are called intelezi. The intelezi can only be used for men, as women only wash themselves with water. The time when a man did not bring intelezi, he went to the ford at night. He only washes himself with water only. Washing with intelezi at the ford in the night time is believed to be an unacceptable action as it influences other things for evil.

== Impact of The Religious System of The Amazulu ==
=== Dreaming in the Contact Zone: Zulu Dreams, Vision and Religion ===
The Religious System of the Amazulu still has a direct impact today. An example would be an academic journal called Dreaming in the Contact Zone: Zulu Dreams, Visions and Religion in the Nineteenth-Century in Africa created by David Chidester. In his writing he stated that the British colonialism had obstructed the religious elements of Africa and other aspects of the indigenous patterns. The Africans were unable to dream under the conditions of colonialism because they believed that “power speaks to power” which they indicated that the “European colonial administrator did all of their dreamings”.

Chidester stated that Callaway called the book, The Religious System of the Amazulu, as “subjective apparition or brain sensation of African dream life”. In the context of comradeship, this book has drawn together the forces imposed by local officials, the ethnographic research for Christian missionaries, the indigenous Africans and especially for the community of Zulu converts. His book became popular for providing the basis of religious beliefs for anthropologists E. B. Taylor.

In the context of colonialism, the book has given insights into spiritual and material aspects of aboriginal dreams in a contact zone. They stated that they have found evidence of dreams linking to maintaining traditional rituals of ancestral exchange and presence. Forbye, they discover disruption of dreaming from the colonial circumstances of dispossession and displacement. The academic journal perceived that the dreams had emigrated under colonial state, the Zulu report suggested that the dreaming remained as a medium for negotiation and navigating within the contact zone.

=== Zulu Thoughts and Patterns ===
Axel-Ivar Berglund published a book called Zulu Thoughts and Patterns where he quoted and reflected the elements in The Religious System of The Amazulu. He quoted Callaway's impression of the Zulu back then on how there is no clear distinction between a sky divinity and the shades. Burgland commented that the present Zulu are expressing the clear difference between the Lord of the Sky and the shade. The book also quoted some of the impacts Callaway made through his literature. He made the impact of pulling the interest of missionaries, philologists, ethnologists, antiquarians and the general populace. He stated that The Religious System of the Amazulu has become one of the stepping stones to “teach the English Zulu or the Zulu English”.

Sir H. Rider Haggard references the volume in the Preface to his epic of the Zulus, Nada the Lily (1892). Nadine Gordimer also cited extracts of the book at the beginning of the chapters of her novel The Conservationist.
