= Joab Mzamane =

- Born: Joab Cornelius Mhlangenqaba Mzamane; October 10, 1920; Ngxaza, Tsolo
- Died: March 14, 1989 (aged 68)
- Occupation: agriculturalist
- Children: Sitembele Mzamane
- Relatives: Joe Mzamane

Joab Cornelius Mhlangenqaba Mzamane (10 October 1920 – 14 March 1989) was an agriculturalist and father of Bishop Sitembele Mzamane.

== Life and work ==
Joab was born in Ngxaza, Tsolo, Eastern Cape in 1920. His mother was Martha Mzizi and his father was Shadrach Mzamane who was an Anglican voluntary preacher.

Joab worked for most of his career around the Eastern Cape and contributed to the plantation of numerous forests in the Transkei area. He is most noted for the study of a "New approach to veld management." Ulimo Nemfuyo.
