= Assistant bishop =

Bishop who assists the diocesan bishop or Ordinary

An assistant bishop in the Anglican Communion is a bishop appointed to assist a diocesan bishop.

== Church of England ==
In the established Church of England, assistant bishops are usually retired (diocesan or suffragan) bishops – in which case they are honorary assistant bishops. Historically, non-retired bishops have been appointed to be assistant bishops – however, unlike a diocesan or suffragan they do not hold a see: they are not the "Bishop of Somewhere". Some honorary assistant bishops are bishops who have resigned their see and returned to a priestly ministry (vicar, rector, canon, archdeacon, dean etc.) in an English diocese. A recent example of this is Jonathan Frost, Dean of York, who was also an honorary assistant bishop of the Diocese of York, with membership of the diocesan House of Bishops (i.e. sits and votes with the archbishop and bishops suffragan in Diocesan Synod).

=== Ex-colonials ===
From the mid-19th to the mid-to-late 20th centuries, with the population growth of England, diocesan bishops sought out various levels of episcopal assistance. Suffragan bishops had been legally possible but never appointed for over two hundred years, and there were many ecclesiological, pragmatic and theological objections to their use. So Ordinaries took to appointing Englishmen who had been consecrated bishops for the colonies as stipendiary assistant (or coadjutor — without right of succession) bishops in their diocese, often with another post such as an especially notable (or lucrative) living. As this practice increased, it drew heavy criticism for depriving those colonies of 'their' bishop. The trends of 'returning' bishops slowly faded with the resumption of old and erection of new suffragan sees, which started in 1870 with Dover and Nottingham and continued steadily till Brixworth in 1989. These bishops were titled quite inconsistently, and referred to as assistant bishops, coadjutor bishops, and even as suffragan bishops; the most stable forms were "Assistant Bishop of {Diocese}" and "Bishop {Surname}".

=== Recent stipendiaries ===
From 1987 until 2016, there were two successions of assistant bishops who were active rather than retired: the Assistant Bishop of Newcastle and the Assistant Bishop of Leicester. In practice, they acted almost exactly like a suffragan bishop (those dioceses had none), whereas they were actually stipendiary assistant bishops. Following the passage of the Bishops and Priests (Consecration and Ordination of Women) Measure 2014 by General Synod, further appointment to these roles was made untenable. Therefore, when their incumbents retired in 2016 and 2017 respectively, they were replaced with suffragan bishops: the Bishop of Berwick (a see abeyant since the 16th century) for the Diocese of Newcastle, and the Bishop of Loughborough (a newly erected see) for the Diocese of Leicester.

== Anglican Church of Australia ==
In the Anglican Church of Australia, the appointments of assistant bishops have been made in accordance with the Assistant Bishops' Canon since 1966. In the Australian dioceses, these assistant bishops function similarly to suffragan bishops in England (the Australian church has no suffragans per se). According to the 1966 canon, while the term coadjutor bishop may be used for an assistant bishop, no bishop may have the right or expectation to succeed to a diocesan see.

== The Episcopal Church ==
In the US-based Episcopal Church, both the titles assistant bishop and assisting bishop are used. Both are appointed by the diocesan bishop and must have been previously consecrated as bishop for another position. The appointments are only valid during the term of the diocesan who makes the appointment. Assistant bishops are usually full time and assisting bishops serve on a more limited part-time or short-term basis. The title visiting bishop is used in some diocese for assisting bishops. In the 19th century, the title assistant bishop was used for bishops coadjutor.

In 2022, the bishops of Vermont, New Hampshire, and Maine appointed each other as assisting bishops in their dioceses to foster regional cooperation.

== Church in Wales ==
See Church in Wales#Assistant bishops

== See also ==
- Anglicanism
- Auxiliary bishop
