= Henry Callaway =

Missionary, Bishop of St. John's

The Right Reverend Henry Callaway
- Bishop of St John's
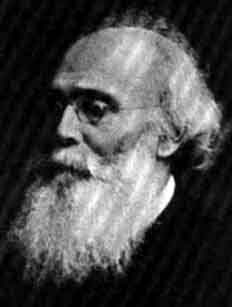
- Church: Anglican
- See: Diocese of St John's
- In office: 1873 – 1876
- Predecessor: (none)
- Successor: Bransby Lewis Key
- Previous post: Rector

Orders
- Ordination: 1855 by John William Colenso
- Consecration: 1 November 1873 by Robert Eden, Henry Cotterill and Alexander Forbes

Personal details
- Born: 17 January 1817 either Lymington, Hampshire, or Somerset
- Died: 26 March 1890 (aged 73)

Henry Callaway (17 January 1817 in either Lymington, Hampshire, or Somerset – 26 March 1890) was a missionary for the Church of England and bishop of St John's, Kaffraria, in the Church of the Province of Southern Africa.

== Pre-missionary life ==
Henry Callaway was the son of a bootmaker. He was educated at Crediton Grammar School and became a teacher in 1835. His headmaster was a Quaker, and Callaway soon joined the Society of Friends.

Later, he was a chemist's assistant and a surgeon's assistant. He began to study surgery and in 1842 he was licensed by the Royal College of Surgeons of England. He was licensed by the Apothecaries' Society in 1844.

He married Ann Chalk in 1845. In 1852, when his health began to fail, he sold his practice and spent a year in France. By the next year he had graduated from King's College, Aberdeen, with plans to become a physician.

== Missionary work ==
Soon after graduating, he became interested in missionary work. In 1854, he was made a deacon by John Colenso, bishop of Natal having become a member of the Church of England two years earlier. Soon afterwards, he went as a missionary to Africa. Initially, he was stationed at Ekukanyeni (near Pietermaritzburg), but, after being ordained as a priest in 1855, he was made rector of St. Andrew's church, Pietermaritzburg .

In 1858, he was granted land near the Umkomazi River and settled on the banks of the Nsunguze River,30.097929°S 30.295043°E he named his settlement Springvale. It was here that he began his study of the Zulu people, their religious beliefs and other customs and obtained the information which enabled him to write his books Nursery Tales, Traditions, and Histories of the Zulus (published in 1868) and The Religious System of the Amazulu (published in 1870). He also translated the Book of Psalms and the Book of Common Prayer into the Zulu language.

In 1873, he was recalled to England so he could be consecrated as the first missionary Bishop of St John's, Kaffraria. He left Great Britain the following year. In 1876, he moved the seat of his diocese to Umtata, where he founded St John's Theological College.

His health, however, began to fail, and he resigned his post in 1886. The next year he returned to England, making his home at Ottery Saint Mary, where he lived until his death in 1890.

== Publications ==
- The Religious System of the Amazulu ... in Their Own Words. Springvale, Natal: J. A. Blair. 1868.
- Nursery Tales, Traditions, and Histories of the Zulus: In Their Own Words. Springvale, Natal: J. A. Blair. 1868. p. 380.
- Some remarks on the Zulu language. Pietermaritzburg. 1870.
- Immediate Revelation. London: Harvey and Darton. 1842. "Being a Brief View of the Dealings of God with Man in All Ages, Showing the Universal and Immediate Agency of the Holy Spirit Under Different Dispensations..."
- Izinyanga Zokubula, Or, Divination, as Existing Among the Amazulu. Springvale, Natal: J.A. Blair. 1884.
- Amatongo, Or, Ancestor Worship as Existing Among the Amazulu in Their Own Words with a Translation Into English and Notes. Springvale, Natal: J. Blair. 1869.
- The Prophets. Pietermaritzburg: Springvale Mission Station. 1872.
- The Way to Christ. 1844.
- A memoir of James Parnell, with extracts from his writings. London: C. Gilpin. 1846.
- The Last Word of "Modern Thought.". 1866. "Two Sermons, Preached at Saint Peter's Cathedral, and at Saint Andrew's Church, Pietermaritzburg, Natal ... December, 1865"
- A Sermon on the Ordination of Two Natives. 1872.
- Kaffraria Church Mission. 1874.
- A Fragment on Comparative Religion. 1874.
- Missionary Sermons. London: George Bell. 1875.
- On the Religious Sentiment Amongst the Tribes of South Africa: A Lecture Delivered at Kokstad. 1876.
- From Pondoland to Cape Town and Back. 1877.
- A Brief Account of the Kaffraria Church Mission From 1874-1877. 1877.

== Notes ==
Anglican Church of Southern Africa titles
New diocese	Bishop of St John's; 1873 – 1886	Succeeded by Bransby Key
