= Diocese of Leicester =

Diocese of the Church of England

Coordinates: 52.6347°N 1.1370°W

Diocese of Leicester Dioecesis Leicestriensis
- Coat of arms

- Flag

Location
- Ecclesiastical province: Canterbury
- Archdeaconries: Leicester, Loughborough

Statistics
- Parishes: 234
- Churches: 324

Information
- Cathedral: Leicester Cathedral
- Language: English

Current leadership
- Bishop: Martyn Snow, Bishop of Leicester
- Suffragan: Saju Muthalaly, Bishop of Loughborough
- Archdeacons: Claire Wood, Archdeacon of Loughborough; Richard Trethewey, Archdeacon of Leicester

Website
- leicester.anglican.org

The Diocese of Leicester is a Church of England diocese based in Leicester and including the current county of Leicestershire. The cathedral is Leicester Cathedral, where the Bishop of Leicester has his episcopal chair.

The diocese is divided into two archdeaconries, the Archdeaconry of Leicester in the east of the county and the Archdeaconry of Loughborough in the west. The former is divided into the rural deaneries of City of Leicester; Framland (Melton Mowbray); Gartree First and Second; and Goscote. The latter is divided into the rural deaneries of Akeley East, South and West; Guthlaxton; and Sparkenhoe East and West.

The diocese owns a retreat house at Launde Abbey near East Norton.

== History ==
The Middle Angles first had a bishopric in 680 and the Anglo-Saxon cathedral was probably located close to (if not on the site of) the present cathedral. The original diocese fell victim to the invasion by the Danes around 870 and after the establishment of the Danelaw in 886 the diocese's seat was moved to Dorchester in Oxfordshire and, taking over the existing Diocese of Lindine (created in 678), became the Diocese of Dorchester. From Dorchester, Oxfordshire, the See was later moved to Lincoln in 1072 under King William I, the diocese then becoming the Diocese of Lincoln. Henry VIII divided the larger dioceses at the time of the English Reformation and the Diocese of Lincoln was divided in three. In 1539 a new cathedral was being erected, but it was never completed and Peterborough was chosen as the seat of the new diocese and Peterborough Abbey as the cathedral.

In the 19th century there were suffragan bishops of Leicester whilst the bishopric was still within the Diocese of Peterborough. The modern diocese was founded on 12 November 1926 from the archdeaconries of Leicester and Loughborough and part of the Archdeaconry of Northampton, all from the Diocese of Peterborough. St Martin's Church, Leicester, was elevated as the cathedral of the new see.

Leicestershire was included in the new Diocese of Peterborough in the Victorian era reforms, the archdeaconry of Leicester became part of Peterborough diocese on 1 May 1839 and, on 12 November 1926, the modern Diocese of Leicester was founded from Leicester and Loughborough archdeaconries and part of the archdeaconry of Northampton.

== Bishops ==
The diocesan Bishop of Leicester is assisted by the Bishop of Loughborough (the sole suffragan bishop, Saju Muthalaly). Alternative episcopal oversight (for parishes in the diocese which reject the ministry of priests who are women) is provided by the provincial episcopal visitor, Luke Irvine-Capel, Bishop suffragan of Richborough, who is licensed as an honorary assistant bishop of the diocese. There are currently two retired bishops living in the diocese who are licensed as honorary assistant bishops: Christopher Boyle, former Assistant Bishop of Leicester, and Peter Fox, former Bishop of Port Moresby.

== See also ==
- Category:Church of England church buildings in Leicestershire
