= Anglican Diocese of Mthatha =

Diocese of the Anglican Church of Southern Africa

Diocese of Mthatha

Location
- Country: South Africa
- Ecclesiastical province: Southern Africa
- Metropolitan: Cape Town
- Archdeaconries: 19

Statistics
- Parishes: 96

Information
- Rite: Anglican
- Established: 1872
- Cathedral: St John's Cathedral, Mthatha
- Patron saint: St John

Current leadership
- Bishop: Vacant
- Metropolitan Archbishop: Thabo Makgoba

Website
- www.mthatha.anglican.org

The Diocese of Mthatha is a diocese of the Anglican Church of Southern Africa in the Eastern Cape province of South Africa. Before 2006 it was known as the Diocese of St John's, and earlier still as that of Kaffraria. The diocese currently has 96 parishes.

== History ==
When the Diocese of Grahamstown in the south under Bishop John Armstrong, and Diocese of Natal in the north-east under Bishop John William Colenso were founded, they each included part of an area which in 1872 became the diocese of St John's.

Bishop Henry Callaway was consecrated in Edinburgh in 1873 as the first bishop of the diocese. In Bishop Callaway's new diocese, apart from the mission station he started at Clydesdale, there were five or six other centres of missionary work. The oldest being St Mark's. The first part of Callaway's work was spent trying to find the best way to organise the diocese. The chief problem was to link Clydesdale with the St Mark's group in the south. He first attempted to establish the See at Clydesdale, which was too far north, and then at St Andrew's, not far from Lusikisiki, which turned out to be inaccessible except by sea. He finally settled on a place on the Mthatha River. A town sprang up around the bishop's mission station and Pro-cathedral.

The first Pro-Cathedral of the diocese was built of wood and iron and was also the first church in Mthatha. It could seat a congregation of 250. It was dedicated at the Diocese of St John's second synod on 24 June 1876.

By the turn of the twentieth century a stone-built cathedral had been erected on the top of a hill leading to the administrative and commercial centre of Mthatha. George Fellowes Prynne was the architect and originally designed an impressive looking cathedral. His plan shows a cruciform church, with a nave 147 feet in length, by 36 feet in width, divided into 7 bays. The chancel is 67 feet long by 30 feet wide. The north and south transepts from chapels accommodating 189 and 146 people respectively. East of the chapels are the vestries and organ chamber, the latter being over the clergy vestry, and speaking into the south chapel and chancel. Only the nave was completed, which is the present cathedral of St John the Evangelist.

In 2010 the southern part of the diocese, around Ngcobo and Butterworth, was separated and constituted as the new Diocese of Mbhashe.

== List of bishops ==
Bishops of St John's
From	Until	Incumbent	Notes
1873	1886	Henry Callaway	(1817-1890)
1887	1901	Bransby Lewis Key	(1838-1901)
1901	1922	Joseph Watkin Williams	(1857-1934)
1923	1943	Edward Harold Etheridge	(1872-1954)
1943	1951	Theodore Sumner Gibson	(1885-1953)
1951	1956	Henry St John Tomlinson Evans	(1905-1956)
1956	1980	James Leo Schuster	(1912-2006)
1980	1984	Godfrey William Ernest Candler Ashby	(1930-2023)
1985	2000	Jacob Zambuhle Bhekuyise Dlamini	(1935-2001)
2000	2006	Sitembele Tobela Mzamane	
Bishops of Mthatha
2006	2017	Sitembele Tobela Mzamane	
2017	2021	Nkosinathi Ndwandwe	translated from Natal
2021	2026	Thembinkosi Jemuel Ngombane	

== Assistant bishops ==
In 1962, Alphaeus Zulu was Assistant Bishop of St John's.

== Coat of arms ==
The diocese assumed arms around the time of its inception, and had them granted by the College of Arms in 1954: Azure, Saint John the Evangelist Argent holding a chalice Or.
