= Kaffraria =

Former name for a region in South Africa

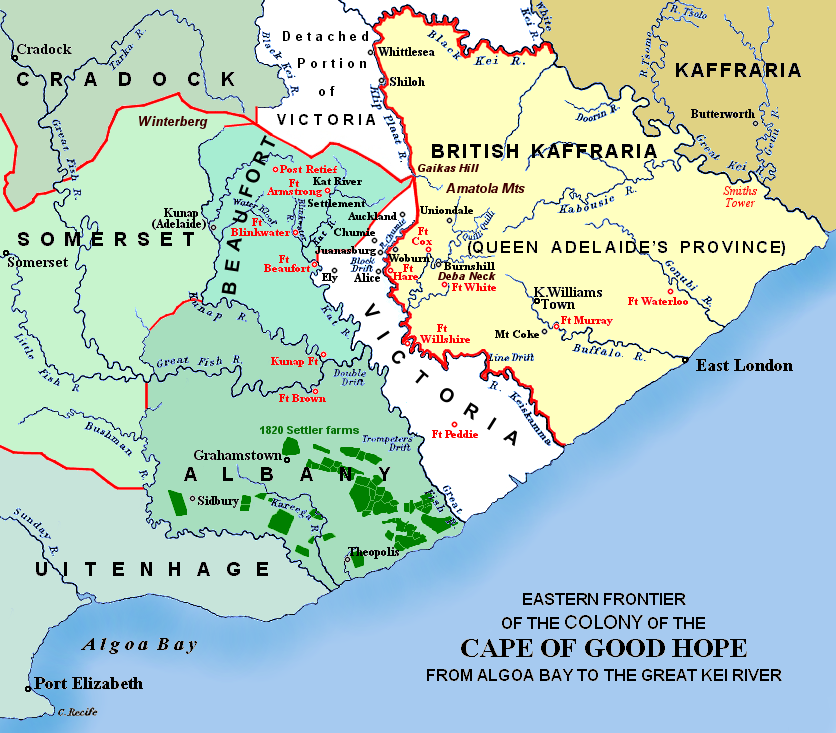
Eastern Frontier, Cape of Good Hope, circa 1835

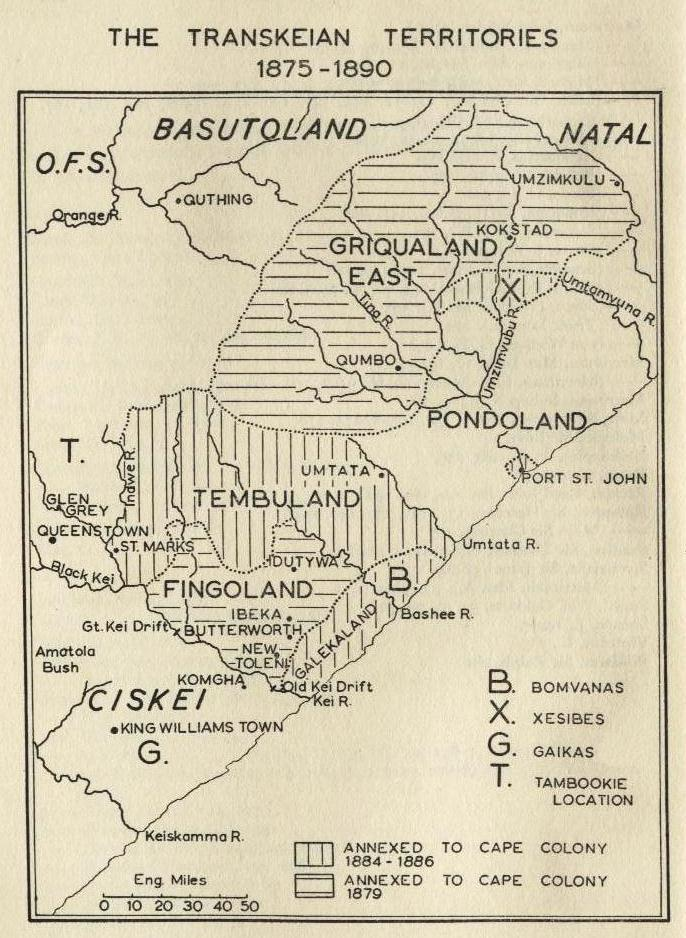
Divisions of Kaffraria on a map of the Transkei Cape frontier 1875-1890

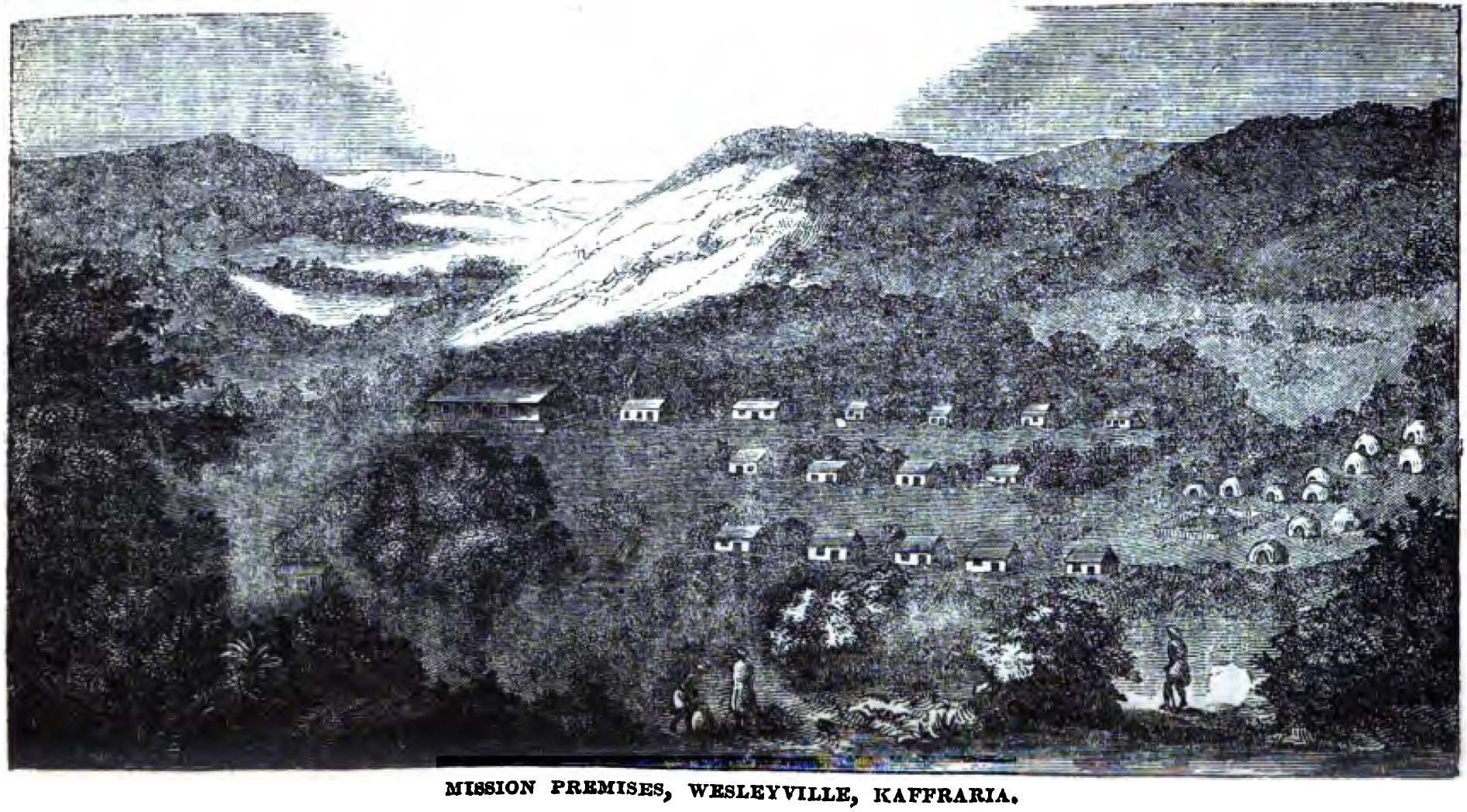
Mission Premises, Wesleyville, Kaffraria (July 1852)

Kaffraria, Kaffiria, or Kaffirland, was the descriptive name given to the southeast part of what is today the Eastern Cape of South Africa. Kaffraria, i.e., the land of the Kaffirs, is no longer an official designation (with the term kaffir, originally the Arabic term for a non-believer in Islam, now considered an offensive racial slur in South Africa).

The districts now known as King Williams Town and East London were annexed by the British early on and were thus known as British Kaffraria (later annexed to Cape Colony in 1865). The remaining Xhosa territory beyond the Kei River, south of the Drakensberg Mountains and as far as the Natal frontier, remained independent for longer and was known as Kaffraria proper.

As a geographical term, it was later used to indicate the Transkeian territories of the Cape provinces comprising the four administrative divisions of Transkei, Pondoland, Tembuland, and Griqualand East, incorporated into Cape Colony at various periods between 1879 and 1894. They had a total area of 18,310 km^{2} and a population (1904) of 834,644, of whom 16,777 were designated white by the colonial government. Excluding Pondoland (not counted before 1904), the population had increased from 487,364 in 1891 to 631,887 in 1904.

== See also ==
- Ciskei
- Transkei
- Xhosa Wars
- Kaffrarian Rifles
- Diocese of Kaffraria
