= St. Anne's Diocesan College =

St Anne's Diocesan College

Location
- Hilton Avenue, Leonard, Hilton, 3245, KwaZulu-Natal, South Africa. Midlands; Hilton, KwaZulu-Natal; South Africa; 29°33′30″S 30°17′55″E

Information
- Type: Private, Boarding
- Motto: Res Non Verba, Crux Non Vis - Deeds not Words, the Cross not Force
- Established: 1877; 149 years ago
- Sister school: Michaelhouse
- Headmistress: Mrs Debbie Martin
- Exam board: IEB
- Grades: 8–12
- Gender: Female
- Age: 13 to 18
- Enrollment: 440 girls
- Language: English
- Schedule: 07:00 - 15:00
- Campus: Urban Campus
- Colours: Blue; Navy; White
- Website: stannes.co.za

St Anne's Diocesan College is a private girls' boarding school situated in the small town of Hilton (Umgungundlovu District Municipality) in the KwaZulu-Natal Midlands of South Africa.

== History ==
St Anne's Diocesan College was founded by the Rt Revd William Macrorie, Bishop of Maritzburg (Note: During the controversy between Robert Gray (bishop of Cape Town) and John Colenso, Bishop of Natal, a rival Diocese of Maritzburg was established and Macrorie was its first bishop, Hamilton Baynes was its second and last bishop) and Miss Creswell in 1877 in the Manse Building in Pietermaritz Street in Pietermaritzburg. In 1878 the school was moved to the corner of Loop Street and Pine Street in Pietermartzburg. The move to its current location in the village of Hilton which lies above Pietermaritzburg happened in 1904.

In 1977 the tradition to wear white to the matric ball was started.

== Previous lady wardens and headmasters/headmistresses ==
- 1877-1879 Miss Creswell (1st lady warden)
- 1879-1889 Miss Usherwood
- 1890-1903 Miss Marianne Browne
- 1903-1907 Miss Isabel Drury
- 1907-1917 Miss Frances Baines
- 1917-1941 Miss Dorothy L. Andrews
- 1942-1950 Miss Molliew Kate Stone
- 1950-1954 Miss Molly Woods
- 1954-1955 Miss Dorothy Beggs (Acting Warden)
- 1955-1963 Miss Dorothy McEune
- 1964-1968 Miss Joyce Carew
- 1969-1972 Miss Margaret E. Beer
- 1973-1974 Mrs Sheila Morgan
- 1975-1986 Mr Anthony Cheetham
- 1987-1997 Mr Bill McQuade
- 1998-2009 Mr David Wilkinson
- 2010-2020 Mr David Arguile
- 2021 - Mrs Debbie Martin

== Boarding ==
There are six boarding houses:

- Andrews,
- Frances Baines,
- Macrorie, (Note: named after William Macrorie, bishop of Maritzburg)
- Marianne Browne,
- Mollie Stone and
- Usherwood.

== Notable alumni ==
- Killie Campbell (1881 - 1965), collector of Africana
- Caro Feely, writer, wine educator, winemaker and organic activist
- Mary Stainbank, sculptor
- Candice Swanepoel, supermodel, Victoria's Secret Angel
- Fundi Sithebe, business executive

== See also ==
- List of boarding schools

== Notes and references ==
- Vietzen, Sylvia (1973). A history of education for European girls in Natal: with particular reference to the establishment of some leading schools, 1837-1902. University of Natal Press. p. 211. ISBN 978-0-86980-027-0.
- Randall, Peter (1982). Little England on the veld: the English private school system in South Africa. Ravan Press. p. 78. ISBN 978-0-86975-220-3.
- Beukes, Lauren (2004). Maverick: Extraordinary Women from South Africa's Past. Oshun. ISBN 978-1-77007-050-9.
