= All Souls Church, Umhlali =

All Souls Umhlali is a church in the Anglican Diocese of Natal between Umhlali and Salt Rock on the KwaZulu Natal Dolphin Coast of South Africa.

== History ==
This region was favoured by King Shaka of the Zulus for military barracks, with his capital becoming KwaDukuza (also called Stanger in more recent history) after the death of his mother. One of these Zulu barracks was called Mdumezulu ("where the heavens thunder"). A magisterial post was established near the barracks in 1850 with Mr C.H. Williams becoming the first resident magistrate. For a time the settlement was even known as Williamstown. The first Anglican church services were held at his home. (The ruins of these early settler buildings can be seen on the property at "Foxhill".)

However, Williamstown faded in usage after the magistrate departed and the more descriptive term, "Umhlali", remained in use. Umhlali is the Zulu name for the Monkey Orange tree (Strychnos spinosa), which grew abundantly along the banks of the uMhlali river. It also means "the place of waiting" because settlers and locals would have to wait on the banks before crossing the river on a northward journey.

In 1857 an earthwork fort, Fort Scott, was built by the 85th Regiment of Foot (Bucks Volunteers) on a knoll west of the present highway near the turnoff to Salt Rock. The first church at Umhlali was a temporary wattle-and-daub building of coarse grass daubed inside with red mud. It was built for about £90 with the intention of servicing the fort. Most settler buildings of this time were wattle and daub, thatched with tambootie grass. Daub was composed of clay or ant-heap, tempered with sand and cow dung. Windows were hung on butt hinges. Unfortunately this first church burnt down shortly after completion.

A new fort called Fort Williamson was begun in 1861 close to the mouth of the Thukela, which saw the Umhlali fort being in disrepair in just over a decade after first being built. The same fate befell Fort Williamson in the 1870s, and when the British invaded Zululand in 1879 they replaced it with Fort Pearson overlooking the Thukela drift where the present highway crosses over. Fort Williamson was abandoned without ever seeing any action.

Given the state of disrepair of the local fort, the jail in Williamstown (Umhlali) was designated as a laager for the local farmers in 1878. By March 1879 it was in a state of defence. Foundations on the farm Seaforth to the east of the old main road (the old Robbins Farm) are all that remains of this laager defence.

While understandably nothing remains of the first wattle-and-daub Anglican church, almost nothing is evident of the next Anglican church to be built in Umhlali, St James.

=== St James (Consecrated, 1864 – Demolished, 1889) ===
The wattle-and-daub church was rebuilt but this time with a more permanent structure, using the same design as the Anglican church at Verulam. It was dedicated as St James church. Pictures in the Killie Campbell Collection of Africana at UKZN show St James as a plain building with the usual pointed arches over windows and doors. The gable ends were terminated with small pyramids. There was a large east window with a pointed arch.

The plans used were the same as those previously drawn up for the Anglican church in Verulam. The building was 40 feet (12 m) long by 20 feet (6.1 m) wide. The height of the walls from the floor line was 13 feet (4.0 m) and built of well burnt brick. The walls were 14 inches (360 mm) thick, plastered and whitened with lime. The roof was made of galvanised iron with the inside lined with tongue and groove match board. The rafters were 4.5 inches (110 mm) by 3 inches (76 mm). The timber windows and sashes were to be 1.5 inches (38 mm) thick. In the final event, the church walls were raised by an extra five brick courses. Buttresses had to be placed on the four corners of the church as well as the longest span of walls to provide extra stability.

St James was consecrated by the bishop of Cape Town Robert Gray on 14 June 1864, but its existence was relatively short lived. It fell into disrepair in the interregnum after the Revd Simpson left in 1876. Due to the failure of agriculture, the migration of people away from the district at that time, and the crisis with Bishop Colenso. St James closed its doors in 1877 and became overgrown with fig roots. Political and social instability ensued with the Anglo-Zulu war in 1879. With little prospect of being able raise the finances to save the building, St James was demolished in 1889.

The site of St James would roughly have been where the red-bricked memorial wall has now been built and where ruins of a "well burnt brick" wall are also evident. When St James closed in 1889 the pews were donated to Mr Liege Hulett for the Umhlali Methodist Chapel. The next Anglican church building in Umhlali was only to be built some two decades later.

=== St Albans (Consecrated, 1909 – Disassembled, 1921) ===
The rinderpest swept into Zululand in 1896 from the north, decimating cattle farming, and in the same year, the region experienced a bad drought, knocking agriculture. The Anglo-Boer War (1899–1902) heralded in the new century and on the back of this, as the British had to maintain long lines of supply and communication, industrialization had come into its own, especially the prefabrication of parts. Kit wood-and-iron utility buildings, which were popular in the diamond rush to Kimberley and the gold rush to the Witwatersrand, came back into their own for military use. Church organisations also made use of this trend to fast track the building of churches in the colonies.

Two decades after the demolition of the previous Anglican church, St Albans was built. A wood and galvanised iron kit church was erected at a new site (Note: Location of the All Souls church at Umhlali '"`UNIQ--templatestyles-0000000A-QINU`"'29°28′09″S 31°13′10″E) near Umhlali (on what is now the R102), not the previous site of St James. The bishop of Natal, Frederick Samuel Baines consecrated this new building in 1909. The design was typical of church kits that were exported from England and reassembled overseas. Many can still be found today in the Midlands. These buildings were ordered from a catalogue and shipped out in kit form from England. St Albans was disassembled and sold to Darnall, further north, to make way for the construction of All Souls in 1921.

=== All Souls (Consecrated, 1921 – Moved, 2011) ===
A new church was built in Umhlali of brick and plaster and dedicated on 30 May 1921 by Frederick Samuel Baines, Bishop of Natal. This forth church was renamed All Souls as a memorial to the people of the district who were killed or served during the First World War (1914–1918). A transept was added to All Souls in the late 1980s along with a hall.

A new site at 1 Sheffield Beach Road (Note: Location of the present All Souls Church in Salt Rock '"`UNIQ--templatestyles-0000000C-QINU`"'29°28′56″S 31°13′56″E) was purchased in 2000. Work began on the new All Souls in 2010, with the first phase being completed in 2011. The new All Souls was dedicated on 13 March 2011 by the bishop of Natal, Rubin Phillip.

== List of ministers ==
=== Pre-parish days ===
- 1852 – The Revd J. Shuter
- 1855 - The Revd A.W.L Rivett
- 1856 – The Ven Charles MacKenzie
- 1859 – Interregnum

=== St James, dedicated 1864 ===
- 1864 – The Revd Elder (of Verulam)
- 1867 – The Revd G.H. Mason
- 1874 – Interregnum (services led by Mr Lennox)
- 1875 – The Revd Simpson
- 1876 – Interregnum (St James closes, falls into disrepair)

=== (Under Stanger Parish) ===
- 1880 - The Revd Peter Frank Cadman
- 1885 – The Revd William Joseph Helmore Banks
- 1889 – The Revd Henry Robert Alkin
- 1892 – The Revd Henry Ernest Hawker
- 1906 – The Revd Charles Samuel Mills

=== St Albans, dedicated 1909 ===
- 1910 – The Revd David Joshua James
- 1914 – The Revd Norman Colhoun Logan
- 1918 – The Revd Hugh Leslie Clarke

=== All Souls, dedicated 1921 ===
- 1922 – The Revd Francis Robinson
- 1926 – The Revd William Mountford
- 1935 – The Revd Griffith Phelps Jeudwine
- 1937 – The Revd Lawrence Stephen Man
- 1938 – The Revd Frank Dowling
- 1939 – The Revd Donovan Leslie Martin
- 1940 – The Revd Frank Dowling (Acting)
- 1941 – The Revd Donovan Leslie Martin
- 1946 – The Revd Walter Web
- 1951 – Interregnum
- 1952 – The Revd Albert George Fenton
- 1959 – The Revd Joseph Stevens
- 1986 - The Revd Nigel Patrick Juckes
- 1993 – The Ven Colin Hulme Reid Peattie

=== All Souls Parish ===
- 1998 - The Ven Colin Hulme Reid Peattie
- 2006 - The Ven Rob Earl Taylor
- 2008 - The Revd Rob Edmiston Jobling

=== All Souls, moved and re-dedicated 2011 ===
- 2011 – The Ven Peter Houston
- 2015 - The Revd Tim McGowan (Acting, 3 months)
- 2016 - The Ven Chris Meyer
- 2021 - The Revd Bruce Wooley
- 2022 - The Ven Andrew Manning(tssf)
