= All Saints Church, Maidstone, KwaZulu-Natal =

Church in KwaZulu-Natal, South Africa

Coordinates: 29°32′39″S 31°08′12″E

All Saints Church, Maidstone
- All Saints Church, Maidstone

History
- Dedication: All Saints

Administration
- Diocese: Anglican Diocese of Natal
- Parish: Maidstone

All Saints Church is a church in the village of Maidstone (eThekwini Metropolitan Municipality) on the Dolphin Coast in the Anglican Diocese of Natal in KwaZulu Natal, South Africa.

== History ==
Maidstone in KwaZulu Natal was named after Maidstone in Kent in the UK. It was a model village built exclusively for the white community who worked for the Tongaat Sugar Company. All Saints was likewise named after its English namesake in Kent.

In 1930, thirty-eight members of the sugar mill staff signed a petition asking for a central church to be built. They argued that a church would have a good moral and social influence on the community and would be a welcome addition to the district's architecture. The petition was granted by the Tongaat Sugar Company. Land was subsequently bought by Thomas Hamlyn, who farmed at Frasers, from Edward Saunders, owner of the Tongaat Sugar Estate. In granting the petition one of the company's stipulations was that the building had to have a tiled roof and the walls were to be a least nine inches thick. The directors of the company also reserved the right to intervene should the grounds or buildings not remain in a state of proper repair.

The cornerstone was laid in early 1932 but stopped in June of that year when several workmen fell ill with malaria. Work resumed in July and was sufficiently complete by October the following year (1933) for an opening ceremony. The first priest, the Revd Roderick Davies, furnished the interior through generous donations. All Saints Maidstone was dedicated with the prayer used in 1395 at the dedication of All Saints Maidstone in Kent. All Saints fell under the Parish of Verulam as a chapelry.

== Furnishings ==
In the ensuing years stained-glass windows and plaques were added in memory of some of the families who helped establish the church. Seventy teak chairs were replaced with nineteen pews made of afromasia in 1965.

Upon entering the church the carved reredos can be seen behind the altar, commissioned in the 1950s and carved by the sculptor, Mary Stainbank. The reredos shows twelve figures, six on either side of Jesus, some major, other minor saints, representing different races and ages, both male and female.

== Later developments ==
In the early 1970s a commission was set up by Michael Nuttall, bishop of Natal to investigate parish boundaries. There were two problematic parishes on the north coast, namely Verulam and Stanger, with the boundary between the two running through the future town of Ballitoville (now Ballito). The commission recommended in 1972 that the parish boundary between Verulam and Stanger should simply be the Umhlali River. All Saints fell under St Thomas Verulam along with St Catherine Mt Edgecombe. The commission suggested that All Saints Maidstone and All Souls Umhlali become separate parishes. All Saints was made a parish in 1994.

However various rectors of St Thomas Verulam, resided in the vicarage alongside All Saints' church in Maidstone, for a number of years, notwithstanding the fact that the parish was still officially designated Parish of Verulam till 1994; They were the reverends

- Graham Ronald McCollum 1972 – 1980
- William George Hardwick 1981 – 1985
- Charles Ernest van Heerden 1986 – 1990
- Arthur Henderson Gosling 1992 – 1998.

Thereafter the following priests were in residence at Parish of Maidstone, and all officiated under the oversight of the archdeacon.

- Ivan Ruiters 1999 – 2000
- Ivan Gunkel 2001 – 2003
- Neville Pike 2009 – 2011

As the Parish of Verulam, St Thomas’ was the parish church. The vicarage was moved from Verulam to Maidstone in 1963, and where All Saints’ Church was receiving greater support. In 1992 All Saints' was made the parish church, and so giving the name to the parish.

Upon the retirement of Arthur Gosling in 1998 it was decided that Maidstone would not have an incumbent, but instead would be cared for by the archdeacon. This decision was reversed in 2012 when Peter Gunning was appointed rector.

== Threat and recovery ==
All Saints faced closure in 2003 with the congregation having dwindled to about ten regular members. The church was no longer able to afford a stipendiary priest and was given a year to reverse the slide. Consequently, All Saints was linked with the parish of All Souls Umhlali and came under the oversight of the incumbent rector of All Souls Umhlali. All Saints was faithfully served by non-stipendiary clergy in the area and gradually the turn-around happened. The congregation is now thoroughly multi-racial, drawn from Maidstone and Upper Tongaat, but also from as far away as Ballito, Westbrook and Salt Rock.

== Clergy ==
The following clergy were incumbents, vicars, rectors or priests-in-charge of the Parish of Verulam or its successor, Maidstone:

- 1889–1890 : The Revd Mr Henry John Shildrick
- 1893–1911 : The Revd Mr Frank Dowling
- 1912–1920 The Revd Mr Edward Harry Steele
- 1920–1928 : The Revd Mr Henry Merriman Waters
- 1928–1933 : The Revd Mr Roderic Hugh Davies
- 1934 1940 : The Revd Mr George Ernest Bruce Mort
- 1940–1943 : The Revd Mr James Reginald Truscott
- 1943–1946 : The Revd Mr Corney John Durham
- 1946–1952 : The Revd Mr Charles Taylor Stanham
- 1952–1961 : The Revd Mr Alfred Frederick Cox
- 1962–1968 : The Revd Mr Harold Clive Clark
- 1968–1971 : The Revd Mr Francis Ayland Oulds
- 1972–1980 : The Revd Mr Graham Ronald McCollum
- 1981–1985 : The Revd Canon William George Hardwick
- 1986–1990 : The Revd Mr Charles Ernest van Heerden
- 1991–1998 : The Revd Mr Arthur Henderson Gosling
- 2000 – The Revd Mr Ivan Ruiters
- 2001 – The Revd Mr Ivan Gunkel
- 2003–2006 : Archdeacon Colin Peattie, with the Revd Mr John Alexander
- 2006 – Archdeacon Rob Taylor, with the Revd Mr Neville Pike
- 2008 – Archdeacon Rob Jobling, with the Revd Mr Neville Pike and the Rt Revd Peter Harker
- 2011 – Archdeacon Peter Houston
- 2012 – 2016 The Revd Canon Peter Gunning
- 2017 – The Revd Mr Siyabonga Mdluli with the Revd Mrs Irene Joss

== Sources ==
- Merrington, Peter (December 2006). "Cape Dutch Tongaat: A Case Study in 'Heritage'". Journal of Southern African Studies. 32 (4, Heritage in Southern Africa). Taylor & Francis: 683–699. doi:10.1080/03057070600995426. JSTOR 25065145. S2CID 144785763.
- Merrington, P. (1998). "Heritage, Pageantry and Archivism: Creed Systems and Tropes of Public History in Imperial South Africa, c.1910". Kronos: Journal of Cape History (25): 129–151. JSTOR 41056431.
- Brain, J. B. (1983). Christian Indians in Natal, 1860–1911: An Historical and Statistical Study. Oxford University Press, South Africa. p. 255. ISBN 978-0-19-570297-2.
- Pilkington, Alice Leonie (1992). Anglican Parish Churches in Natal, 1824-1910: An Architectural Evaluation. University of Natal.
- Watson, Robert George Theodor (1960). Tongaati: an African experiment. London: Hutchinson.
