= Candice Swanepoel =

South African model (born 1988)

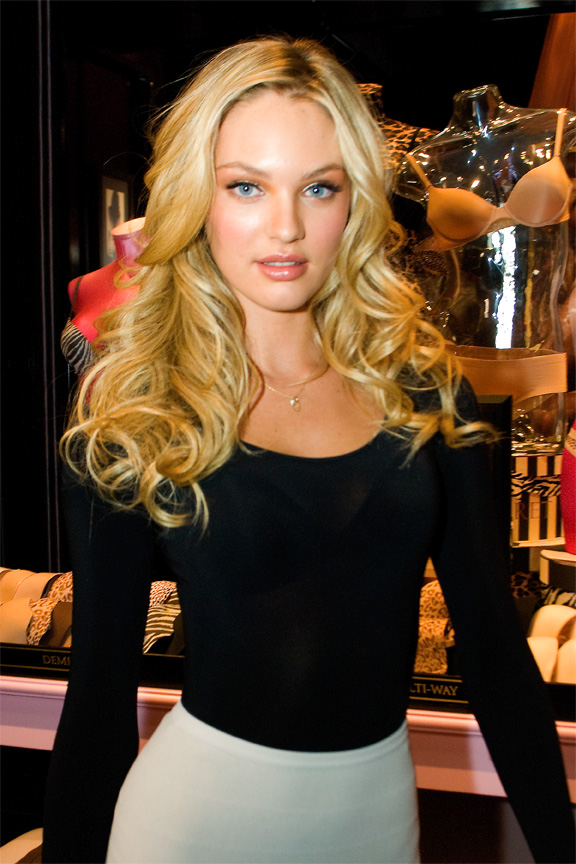
- Swanepoel in 2010
- Born: Candice Susan Swanepoel; 20 October 1988 (age 38); Mooi River, Natal, South Africa
- Occupation: Model
- Years active: 2003–present
- Partner: Hermann Nicoli (2005–2018)
- Children: 2
- Modeling information
- Height: 5 ft 10 in (1.78 m)
- Hair color: Blonde
- Eye color: Blue
- Agency: The Lions (New York); Modelwerk (Hamburg); Munich Models (Munich); Way Model Management (São Paulo); Elite Model Management (Paris)
- Website: candiceswanepoel.com

Candice Susan Swanepoel (/ˈswɒnəpuːl/ SWON-ə-pool, Afrikaans: [ˈsvɑːnəpul]; born 20 October 1988) is a South African model. She is best known for her work with Victoria's Secret. She became a Victoria's Secret Angel in 2010. In 2016, she was listed 8th on the Forbes top-earning models list.

== Early life ==
Swanepoel was born to Willem Swanepoel from Mutare, Zimbabwe and Eileen Swanepoel (née Green) and raised on a farm in Mooi River, South Africa. Swanepoel comes from an Afrikaner family of Dutch origin through her father, while her mother is of British origin. She has one older brother named Stephen. While growing up, Swanepoel was a ballet dancer. She attended boarding school at St. Anne's Diocesan College in the nearby town of Hilton. At age 15, she was spotted by a model scout in a Durban flea market.

== Career ==
Swanepoel has appeared in editorials in American, Italian, British, Spanish, German, Greek, Russian, Australian, Brazilian, Japanese, Korean, Chinese, and Mexican Vogue; Brazilian, British, German and South African Elle; British, South African, Romanian, Mexican and Chinese GQ; American, Spanish, Czech, Argentine, Turkish and Korean Harper's Bazaar; V, Allure, W, and i-D.

Swanepoel has walked the runway for Fendi, Chanel, Tommy Hilfiger, Dolce and Gabbana, Michael Kors, Donna Karan, Giambattista Valli, Jason Wu, Prabal Gurung, Rag & Bone, Oscar de la Renta, Elie Saab, Diane von Fürstenberg, Sportmax, Betsey Johnson, Stella McCartney, Viktor and Rolf, Givenchy, Off-White, Versace, Jean Paul Gaultier, Christian Dior, Blumarine, Etro and Ralph Lauren.

She has appeared in advertising campaigns for Tom Ford, Oscar De La Renta, Givenchy, Chanel, Miu Miu, Tommy Hilfiger, Rag & Bone, Ralph Lauren, Shiatzy Chen, Michael Kors, Blumarine, Versace, Prabal Gurung, Diesel, Guess?, Off-White, Swarovski, Agua Bendita, Colcci, True Religion, Nike, Juicy Couture, as well as for Victoria's Secret since 2007. In addition to appearing in the lingerie brand's commercials, she was a featured model in the 2010 "SWIM" catalog, along with Lindsay Ellingson, Rosie Huntington-Whiteley, Behati Prinsloo, and Erin Heatherton.

In 2010, Swanepoel became a Victoria's Secret Angel. Swanepoel modeled for the Kardashians' 2010 swimwear line. On 12 August 2010, Swanepoel officially opened the first Victoria's Secret retail store in Canada, at West Edmonton Mall, Edmonton. In 2013, Swanepoel was named the cover model of the coveted Victoria's Secret Swim Catalogue. Swanepoel was chosen to wear the "Fantasy Bra" in the 2013 Victoria's Secret Fashion Show. The 10 million dollar bra, named the "Royal Fantasy Bra", was created by Mouawad. The bra and its matching belt featured over 4,200 precious gems, including rubies, diamonds and yellow sapphires set in 18 carat gold with a 52-carat ruby at the center.

In 2018, she launched her own swimwear collection Tropic of C. She won Launch of the Year award at the 5th Annual Daily Front Row Awards.

=== Popularity ===
Swanepoel was voted No. 61 in 2010, No. 62 in 2011, No. 75 in 2013, and No. 36 in 2015 in FHM's annual "100 Sexiest Women in the World" poll and No. 1 in 2014 Maxim's "Hot 100 List". In 2019, she was honored with Revolve's Woman of the Year award. In June 2021 Swanepoel was adjudged the Numero Uno (Number 1) by N4M Media's list of Top 10 most beautiful and hottest South African Actresses and Models.

=== Earnings ===
Swanepoel made her debut at No. 10 on Forbes' "The World's Top-Earning Models" list, with estimated earnings of $3 million between 2010 and 2011. She was ranked No. 9 in 2013 with estimated earnings of $3.3 million. In 2015, she was ranked No 8 with earnings of $5 million. In 2016, she was ranked No 8 with earnings of $7 million.

== Personal life ==
Swanepoel is fluent in Afrikaans, English, and Portuguese, the latter of which she learned from her now ex-fiancé Hermann Nicoli, a Brazilian model. They began dating after they met in Paris when she was 17 and he was 23. In August 2015, the couple announced their engagement. Together, they have two sons, born in October 2016 and June 2018. The couple split in November 2018.

As of 2018, she reportedly splits her time between Brazil and New York City.

== Charity ==
Swanepoel is actively involved in mothers2mothers, a charity devoted to achieving an "HIV-free generation" of children and mothers in Africa. Swanepoel has designed denims for it, and in May 2019, joined the charity as a patron and their global ambassador.
