= Summersdale Publishers =

English independent publishing firm

- Founded: 1990
- Founder: Stewart Ferris and Alastair Williams
- Country of origin: United Kingdom
- Headquarters location: Chichester, West Sussex
- Distribution: Littlehampton Book Services (UK); Peribo (Australia); Nationwide Book Distributors (New Zealand); SG Distributors (South Africa); Trafalgar Square Publishing (US & Canada)
- Publication types: Books
- Official website: summersdale.com

Summersdale Publishers Ltd (often simply Summersdale) is an English independent publishing firm of non-fiction. The company is based in Chichester, West Sussex.

Founded in 1990 by Stewart Ferris and Alastair Williams, it has since published over 800 titles, and has an output of around 90 books per year.

== Publishing philosophy ==
To seek out potential trade bestsellers in the following genres: travel literature, humour, self help, and general non fiction.

== Authors ==
- David Baboulene
- Bidisha
- Edward Enfield
- Caro Feely
- Stewart Ferris
- Peter Kerr
- Imogen Lloyd Webber
- Anna Nicholas
- Geoff Thompson
- Reza Pakravan

== Other media activities ==
- Audiobooks
- E-books
