= Cathedral of the Holy Nativity, Pietermaritzburg =

- Cathedral of the Holy Nativity
- Cathedral of the Holy Nativity, Pietermaritzburg
- 29°36′17″S 30°22′34″E
- Location: Pietermaritzburg, kwaZulu-Natal
- Country: South Africa
- Denomination: Anglican

History
- Consecrated: 22 November 1981

Architecture
- Architect(s): Kammeӱer, Rozendal and Carter-Brown
- Style: Modern

Specifications
- Materials: Red brick and concrete

Administration
- Province: Southern Africa
- Diocese: Diocese of Natal

Clergy
- Bishop: The Rt Revd Nkosinathi Ndwandwe
- Dean: The Very Reverend Thami Tembe

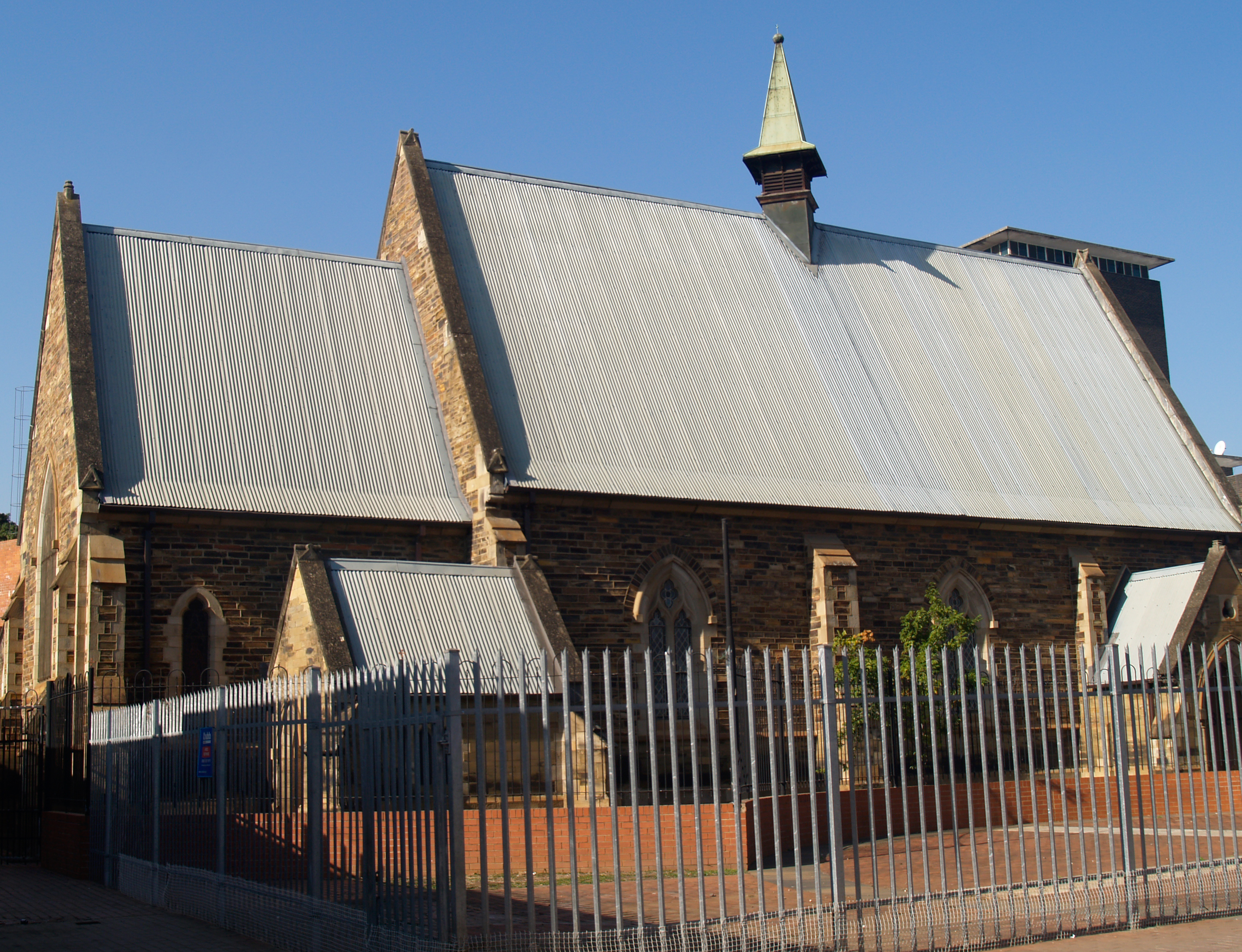
Cathedral of the Holy Nativity, Pietermaritzburg.

The Cathedral of the Holy Nativity is the home of the Anglican Diocese of Natal in Pietermaritzburg, South Africa in the kwaZulu-Natal Province. It is the episcopal seat of the Bishop of Natal. The cathedral is located in Langalibalele Street.

The building of the cathedral followed the uniting of two city parishes while Philip Russell was bishop, that is between 1974 and 1981. After being translated to Cape Town as archbishop, Russell returned to dedicate the cathedral on 22 November 1981.

The building is modern in design and is not universally loved.
