= Mary Stainbank =

South African sculptor (1899 - 1996)

Mary Agnes Stainbank
- Born: 1899; Bellair, Durban, Colony of Natal
- Died: 1996 (aged 96–97)
- Education: Royal College of Art Durban School of Art
- Occupation: Sculptor
- Notable work: Flower Sellers; the John Ross statue; architectural sculptures at Addington Children's Hospital
- Awards: Royal College scholarship

Mary Agnes Stainbank (1899–1996) was a South African sculptor.

== Early life ==
Stainbank born in 1899 on the farm Coedmore in Bellair, Durban, Colony of Natal. She was educated at St. Anne's Diocesan College at Hilton, Colony of Natal. She trained at the Durban School of Art from 1916 to 1921 under John Adams and Alfred Martin, and from 1922 to 1924 at the Royal College of Art, London, under William Rothenstein and Frederick John Wilcoxson. She was awarded a Royal College scholarship in 1925 and studied bronze casting at an engineering firm in London.

== Working life ==
On her return to South Africa in 1926 she established a sculpture studio – Ezayo - on the Coedmore estate where, between 1926 and 1940, she produced her finest work. she was influenced by Eric Gill and Jacob Epstein.

Though credited with introducing a modern school of sculpture to South Africa during her early career, she was often criticized for her use of avant-garde images. Her choice of African subject matter and her use of sharp, angular forms and distortion of limbs to depict her subjects shocked the largely conservative viewers of the time, who were used to the romantic-realist style. As a result, her sculptures did not appeal to the buying public of the day. Many of her freestanding sculptures were shown during the 1930s at exhibitions organized by the Natal Society of Artists.

After service in a military drawing office during World War II she was appointed as head of the sculpture department at the Durban School of Art, where she lectured until 1957.

Though her work did not sell, she continued to create sculptures, which were housed in her studio at Coedmore. In the 1980s, a large body of these works went on display at the Old Parliament Buildings in Pietermartzburg. This collection was subsequently transferred to the Voortrekker/Msunduzi Museum in Pietermaritzburg. With the restructuring of that museum, the work was returned to the Stainbank family.

== Mary Stainbank Memorial Gallery ==
The Stainbank collection is generally regarded as the largest body of work by a single artist in South Africa to have remained intact. The collection is housed at the Mary Stainbank Memorial Gallery at Coedmore, the original Stainbank family estate, where the family settled in the 1880s.

== Works ==
During her career, Stainbank produced many portraits of the people who lived on the Coedmore estate as well as architectural commissions that she received. These include decorations on buildings, in Durban, such as the Children's Hospital at Addington Beach and the government offices in the CBD.

Her many public sculptures in Durban include the Flower Sellers; her gargoyle-like figures on the old Receiver of Revenue building; the pediments and ceramics at the old Addington Children's Hospital and the bronze sculpture of John Ross standing on Durban's Victoria Embankment. The reredos in the church of All Saints Maidstone was done by Stainbank. She designed the Springbok trophy for the South African Polo Association and produced the architectural decorations for the Port Elizabeth Magistrates' Court.

== Notes and references ==
- Mary Stainbank: Retrospective Exhibition. Durban Arts Association. 1988. ISBN 978-0-620-13028-8.
- Laffaye, Horace A. (2015). The Polo Encyclopedia (2nd ed.). McFarland. ISBN 978-0-7864-9577-1.
- Webb, Mary (1985). Precious Stone: The Life and Works of Mary Stainbank. Knox. ISBN 978-0-620-08664-6.
- Hillebrand, Melanie (1987). "Mary Stainbank: Sculptress of Natal" (PDF). Natalia. 17. The Natal Society Foundation.
- Leigh, V. (1998). Mary Stainbank Collection of Sculpture.
- HSRC (2000). Women Marching Into the 21st Century: Wathint' Abafazi, Wathint' Imbokodo. HSRC Press. ISBN 978-0-7969-1966-3.
- Afọlayan, Funso S. (2004). Culture and Customs of South Africa. Greenwood. ISBN 978-0-313-32018-7.
- Rankin, Elizabeth Deane; Dell, Elizabeth; Julia, Meintjes (1989). Images of wood: aspects of the history of sculpture in 20th-century South Africa. Johannesburg Art Gallery. ISBN 978-0-620-13867-3.
- Liebenberg-Barkhuizen, Estelle (2002). "Mary Stainbank and popular culture : images of the "i[n]digene"". South African Journal of Art History. 17. hdl:2263/15086.
- Arnold, Marion I.; Schmahmann, Brenda (2005). Between Union and Liberation: Women Artists in South Africa 1910-1994 (PDF). Ashgate. ISBN 978-0-7546-3240-5.
- Liebenberg, E (1996), Representing "the Other": some thoughts on Mary Stainbank's iconography, Pietermaritzburg: Unpublished paper, Conference of the South African Association of Art Historians
- Van Eeden, Jeanne (1998). "Irma Stern's first exhibition in Pretoria, 1933". South African Journal of Art History. 13. hdl:2263/14624.
- Harber, Rodney (5 June 2013), Heritage Report : Proposed Mary Stainbank Memorial Art Gallery (PDF), Harber and Associates
