= Frederick Roach =

Fred Roach or variants may refer to:

- Fred Roach (1856–1922), Anglican bishop in South Africa
- Freddie Roach (born 1960), American boxing trainer and a former professional boxer
- Freddie Roach (organist) (1931–1980), American soul jazz musician
- Freddie Roach (American football) (1983–present), former football player and current coach
