= Killie Campbell =

Collector of Africana

- Born: Margaret Roach Campbell; 9 September 1881; Mount Edgecombe
- Died: 28 September 1965 (aged 84); Durban
- Occupation: Collector of Africana

Dr Margaret Roach 'Killie' Campbell (1881- 1965) was a South African collector of Africana. Her collection was bequeathed to the University of Natal and is now the Killie Campbell Africana Library. Campbell was the second daughter of Natal politician and sugar magnate, Sir Marshall Campbell.

== Education ==
She was educated at St. Anne's Diocesan College in Hilton, KwaZulu-Natal and at St. Leonard's School in Scotland.

== Work ==
In 1939 Killie stated that, "My Africana collection comprises chiefly old travel books, books on history, biographies, and reminiscences." When describing her Africana collection in an article published in Africana notes and news in September 1945 she wrote, "This Library has approximately 20,000 books, and I have specialized chiefly in history and Bantu life."

== Honours and legacy ==
Campbell was awarded honorary degrees from the University of Natal in 1950 and the University of the Witwatersrand in 1954. She was awarded an honorary fellowship of the South African Library Association in 1958. The City of Durban awarded her civic honours in 1964.
