= Gary Porritt =

South African businessman and embezzler

- Born: 1951 or 1952 (age 74–75); Kwazulu-Natal, South Africa
- Education: University of Natal (BCom)
- Occupation: Businessman
- Employer: Tigon
- Spouse: Bernice Knight
- Children: 4

Gary Patrick Porritt (born 1951 or 1952) is a South African former business magnate. He was the Chief Executive Officer of Tigon, which was once the most successful company on the Johannesburg Stock Exchange, but was arrested in 2003 and held since 2017 in prison awaiting trial.

Porritt had offshore accounts in Panama, which were revealed during the 2016 Panama Papers document leak, as well as accounts in the British Virgin Islands.

His father, Douglas Barrington Porritt (1925 - 2008), a prominent real estate developer, set up the Garry Porritt Children's Trust. Through this, Porritt owned and operated successful farms in the Midlands of KwaZulu-Natal.

Despite his claims to be penniless and unable to afford legal aide, South African courts have estimated his fortune at ZAR100 Million (US$5.2 million.)
