= Killie Campbell Africana Library =

Africana collection at the University of KwaZulu-Natal

- 29.83506942720036°S 31.00503955553446°E
- Location: Durban, South Africa
- Type: academic library

Other information
- Affiliation: University of KwaZulu-Natal

The Killie Campbell Africana Library is a library of Africana at the University of KwaZulu-Natal. It is named after Killie Campbell (1881–1965) who bequeathed her collection of Africana to the (then) University of Natal.
