= Eric Pike =

South African Anglican bishop (1936–2021)

The Right Reverend Eric Pike
- Bishop of Port Elizabeth
- Diocese: Diocese of Port Elizabeth
- In office: 1993–2001
- Predecessor: Bruce Evans
- Successor: Bethlehem Nopece
- Other post: Suffragan bishop of Grahamstown

Orders
- Ordination: 1968
- Consecration: 1993

Personal details
- Born: 11 November 1936
- Died: 17 June 2021 (aged 84)
- Denomination: Anglican

Eric Pike (11 November 1936 – 17 June 2021) was a South African Anglican bishop. He was the Bishop of Port Elizabeth from 1993 to 2001.

He was educated at Graaff Reinet Teachers' Training College and was a teacher at Queen’s College Boys' High School from 1958 to 1965. He trained for the priesthood at St Paul’s Theological College, Grahamstown and was ordained in 1968. He was assistant priest at St John’s, East London and then rector of St Paul’s, Komga. From 1978 he was archdeacon of East London and then suffragan bishop of Grahamstown before his election in 1993 to the See of Port Elizabeth as its third bishop. He was in office until 2001.

== References and sources ==
- Who's Who 2008: London, A & C Black, 2008 ISBN 978-0-7136-8555-8
- Crockford's Clerical Directory Lambeth, Church House, 1976, ISBN (invalid) 0108153674, alternate version: ISBN 0-19-200008-X,
- Pew Leaflet, 20 June 2021 Cathedral of St Michael and St George, 20 June 2021,

OCLC 25885092, OCLC 59162245.

Anglican Church of Southern Africa titles
Preceded by Bruce Evans	Bishop of Port Elizabeth; 1993-2001	Succeeded by Bethlehem Nopece
