= Vernon Inman =

British Anglican bishop

Thomas George Vernon Inman (1904–1989) was an eminent Anglican bishop in the third quarter of the 20th century. He was educated at Selwyn College, Cambridge and ordained in 1931. He was Assistant Missioner at the Wellington College Mission, Walworth before emigrating to South Africa. He then held curacies at Estcourt and St Paul, Durban. Later he was vicar of the church and archdeacon of the area. After this he was bishop of Natal from 1951 to 1974 then Dean of the Province of South Africa. A Sub-Prelate of the Order of St John of Jerusalem, he died on 4 July 1989.

== Notes ==
Anglican Church of Southern Africa titles
Preceded by Leonard Noel Fisher	Bishop of Natal and Dean; 1951 – 1974	Succeeded by Philip Russell
