= Thembinkosi Jemuel Ngombane =

South African Anglican bishop

Thembinkosi Jemuel Ngombane is a South African Anglican bishop: and former Bishop of Mthatha since 2026. On 10 December 2021 he was elected to be the diocesan bishop of the Diocese of Mthatha, by an electoral assembly of the Diocese of Mthatha.

Anglican Church of Southern Africa titles
Preceded by Nkosinathi Ndwandwe	Bishop of Mthatha; 2021-2026	Succeeded by Vacant
