= St Mary's Cathedral, Port Elizabeth =

Coordinates: 33°57′28″S 25°36′01″E

St Mary's Cathedral
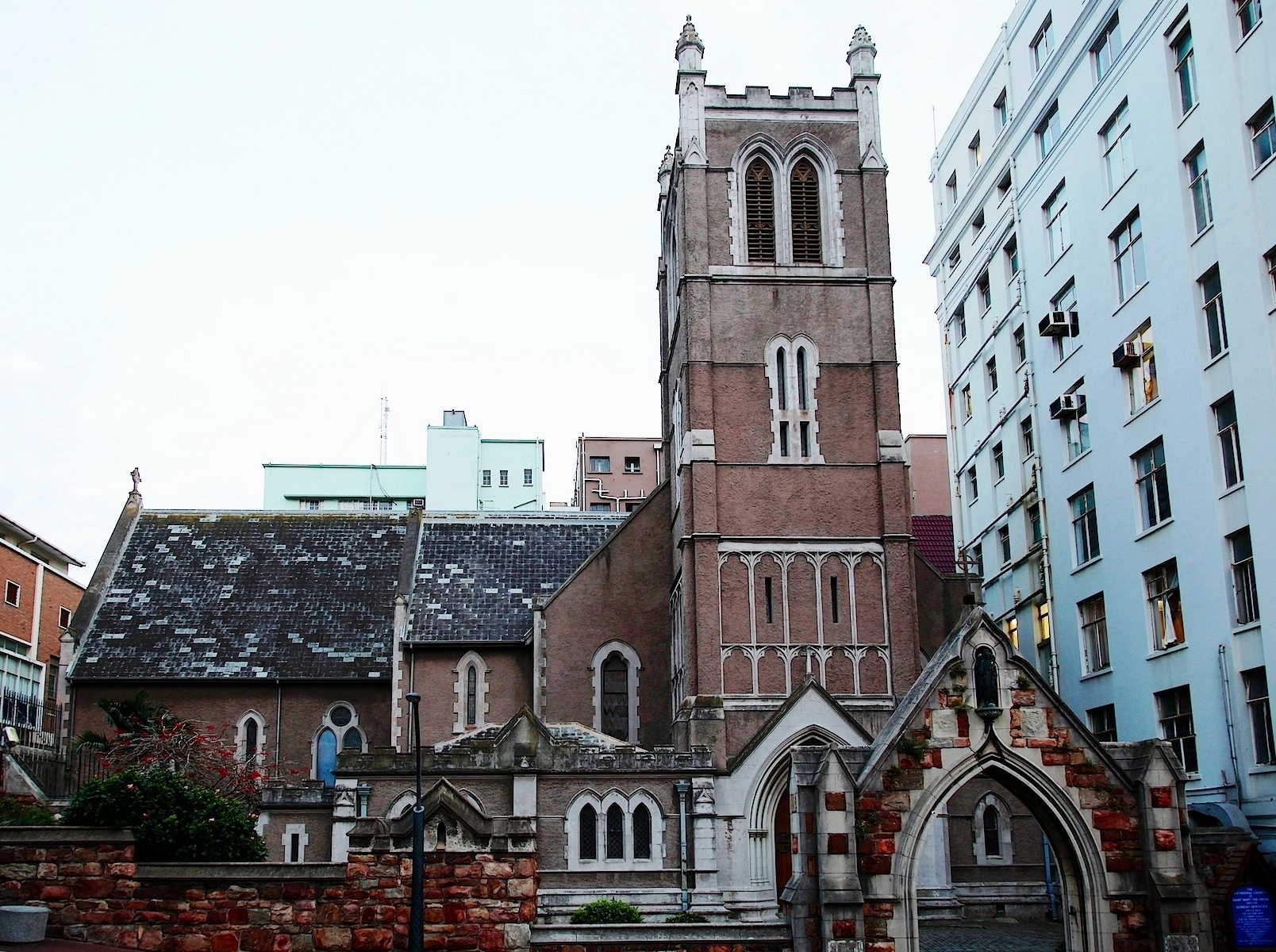
- St Mary's Cathedral, Port Elizabeth in 2012
- Click on the map for a fullscreen view
- Location: Gqeberha
- Country: South Africa

Architecture
- Functional status: Active

St Mary's Cathedral, Port Elizabeth is a religious building that is affiliated with the Anglican Church of South Africa and is located at St Mary's Terrace, Central in the city of Gqeberha in Eastern Cape province, South Africa.

It serves as the main church and seat of the Diocese of Port Elizabeth which was created in 1970. The current incumbent is The Ven. Fumanekile Witness Kula.
