= KwaZulu-Natal Children's Hospital =

Geography
- Location: Durban, South Africa
- Coordinates: 29.866558°S 31.042879°E

Organisation
- Type: Specialist

Services
- Speciality: Children's hospital

History
- Former name: The KwaZulu-Natal Children's Hospital
- Opened: 1931
- Closed: 1984

Links
- Website: www.kznchildrenshospital.org.za
- Lists: Hospitals in South Africa

The KwaZulu-Natal Children's Hospital (originally named the Addington Children's Hospital) in Durban, South Africa was built in 1931 and was the first children's hospital on the African continent.

== History ==
In 1984, at the peak of the struggle against Apartheid, the South African government closed the hospital because it offered services to children of all races in a section of the beachfront that was reserved for ‘white’ people. The buildings fell into a state of dereliction during the 28 years between 1984 and 2012.

The re-establishment of the hospital (now renamed The KwaZulu-Natal Children's Hospital) as a specialized provincial public sector children's hospital that will address adolescent and child health and welfare issues, poverty and urban renewal commenced in 2012.

The KwaZulu-Natal (KNZ) Children's Hospital aims to be cost-effective, environmentally friendly and financially sustainable and will mainly provide ambulatory specialist health care for the youth of the province, regardless of socio-economic background or social standing. It will be a referral center to district and regional hospitals in the province. The hospital will fill ‘niches’ in current public sector services without duplication or replication of services at existing facilities.

== Non-profit public-private partnership ==
The KNZ Children's Hospital Trust was established in 2011 as a non-profit, benevolent and philanthropic institution of a public character to be the fundraising and project management arm for re-establishment of the Children's Hospital. The KZN Children's Hospital Trust is registered in terms of Section 6 (1) of the Trust Property Control Act, 1988 (Act 57 of 1988) and has received Public Benefit (PBO status) (Section 18A) from the South African Revenue Services and is registered for VAT Exemption. The Trust is also registered as a non-profit organization with the KZN Department of Social Development. The KZN Department of Health owns the hospital property. The relationship between the provincial Health Department and the KZN Children's Hospital Trust is governed by a Memorandum of Agreement and a Service Level Agreement. The KZN Department of Health is responsible for operational costs once refurbishment of each building is completed and handed over.

== Beneficiaries ==
KwaZulu-Natal, South Africa is the epicentre of the HIV epidemic globally, with the highest infection rate of any region in the world. The management of children infected and exposed to HIV requires chronic care at a vastly improved quality and coverage than what is currently available. HIV is the handmaiden of TB and large numbers of TB patients are being added to the disease burden in KwaZulu-Natal. Moreover, much of the population is on “Social Protection” and subject to chronic health problems that are typical to those living in poverty. This has resulted in a dramatic increase in the demand for chronic care for children due to the prevalent HIV/AIDs, poverty, malnutrition and TB.

The beneficiaries of the KZN Children's Hospital potentially include approximately 3 million children and adolescents aged 18 years or younger that reside in the province of KwaZulu-Natal, South Africa. This represents 22% of all children in South Africa.

== Art & cultural aspects ==
Four of the seven buildings on site are over 60 years old and are designated ‘heritage buildings. The buildings include several decorative features such as wall paintings, stained-glass works, statues and mosaic tiled floor sections and ceramics by the South African artist, Mary Stainbank and fellow artist, Wilgeford Vann-Hall who was responsible for the design of several stained-glass panels depicting nursery rhymes.

== Financial summary ==
The total current estimated cost of restoration and refurbishment of the entire KZN Children's Hospital complex is approximately US$40 million. Approximately $10 million has been raised to date. The first refurbished building at the hospital was completed in 2013 and has provided services to more than 2,000 children and adolescents to date. A further $30 million is required for completion of all phases of the project.
