= Midlands of KwaZulu-Natal =

Geographic region in central KZN, South Africa

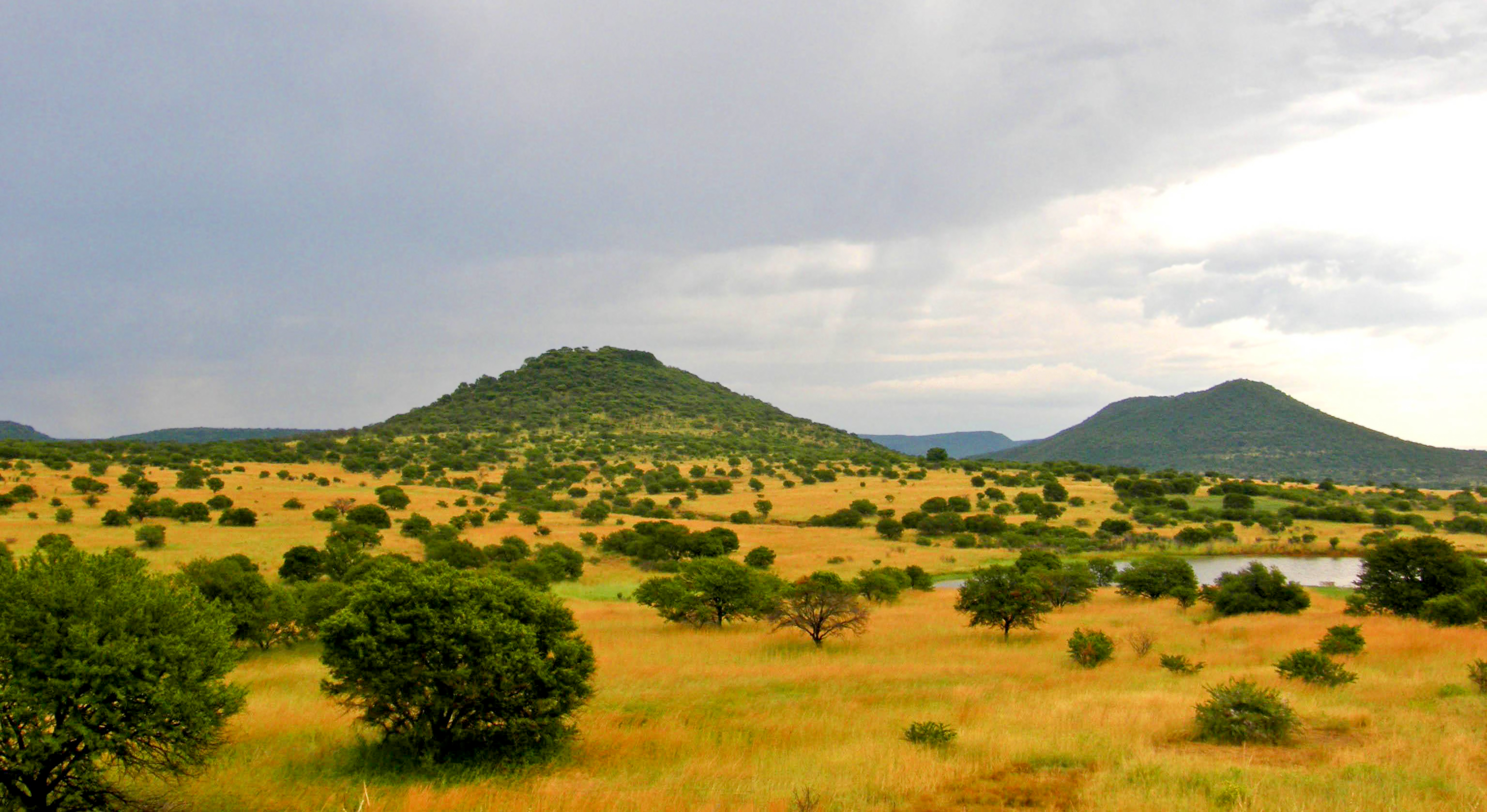
Rural midlands near Pietermaritzburg

The KwaZulu-Natal midlands is an inland area of KwaZulu-Natal, South Africa that starts from Pietermaritzburg and ends before the Drakensberg mountain range; between Pietermaritzburg, Estcourt and Greytown.

== Area ==
Geographic range

The largest city in the midlands is Pietermaritzburg. There are also several towns located in the midlands, including: Estcourt, Howick, Merrivale, Hilton, Lions River, Dargle, Lidgetton, Balgowan, Nottingham Road, Rosetta and Mooi River.

The Midlands Meander is several tourism routes that include accommodation, art and crafts, leisure, activities and restaurant stops.

Some of South Africa's top private schools are located in the Midlands, including: Cowan House, Clifton Preparatory School, Treverton Preparatory School and College, Hilton College, Michaelhouse, Grace College, Hilton and St. Anne's Diocesan College.

The region is also becoming known as a wine-producing region.

== Geography ==
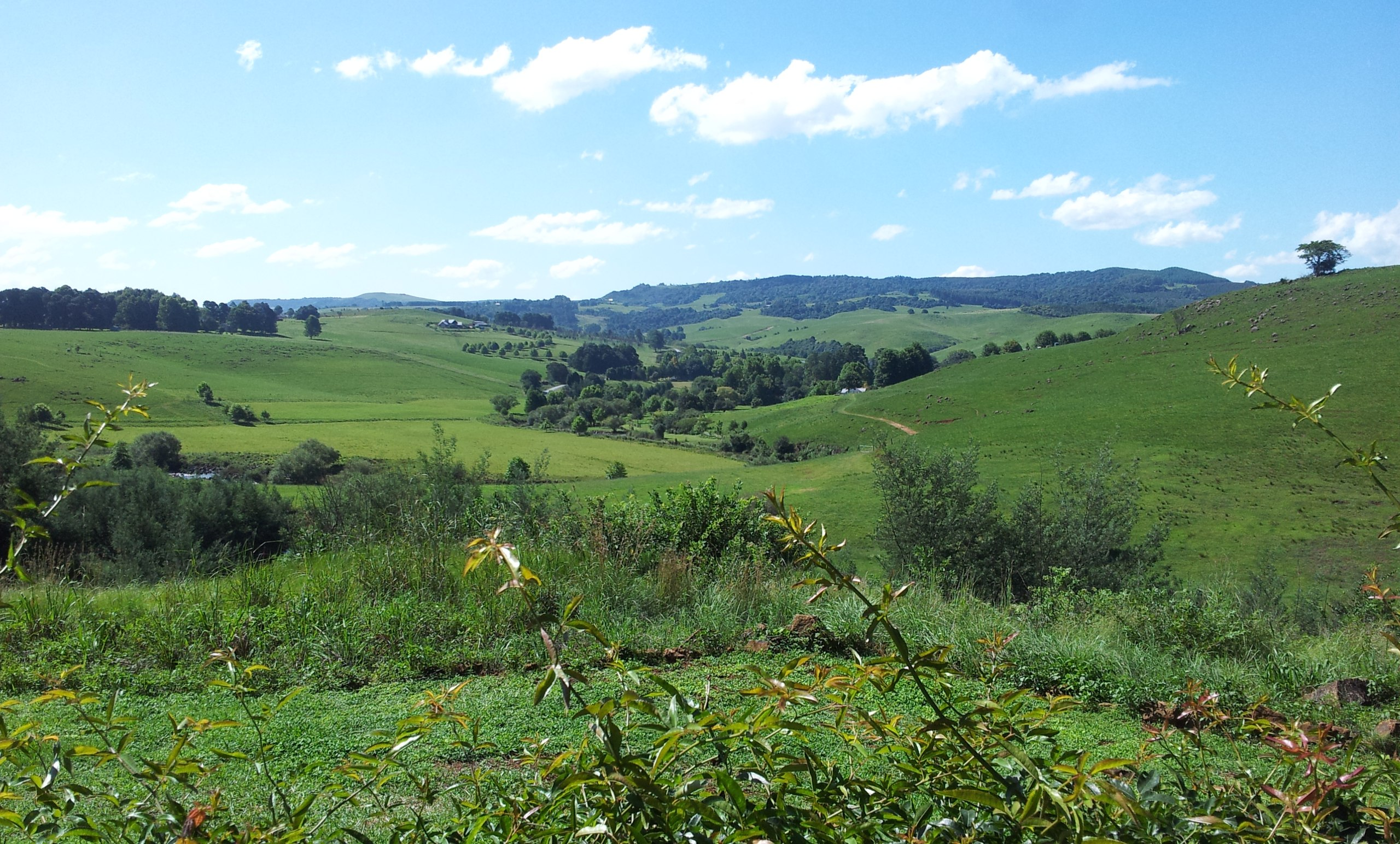
The Midlands landscape in the summer closely resembles a Northern European landscape.

Many parts of the Midlands Meander resemble the Northern European countryside as there are lush green pastures for cattle to graze on, in order to produce milk and cheese and many species of European trees and bushes planted by the English and Dutch settlers.

== Climate ==
The KwaZulu-Natal midlands can be hot and wet in summer, with average daily highs up to 30 °C, and average daily lows of 15 °C while winters are cool and dry, sometimes with snow and frost, with average daily high temperatures of 15 °C and daily lows of up to 0 °C.

== See also ==
- Marutswa Forest, a location within the Midlands
