= Marshall Campbell =

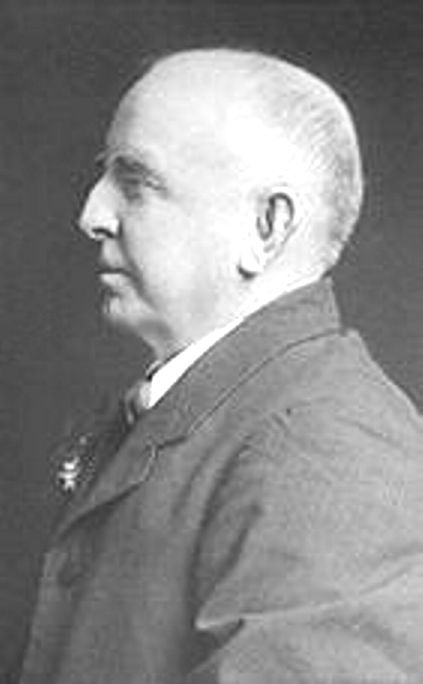

Sir Marshall Campbell (1848–1917) was a pioneer of the sugar industry in the Colony of Natal and parliamentarian concerned with Bantu affairs.

The Conquering Hero, a brig of 320 tons under Captain Cockburn, sailed from the Clyde (Glasgow/Greenock) with 127 settlers on 29 March 1850. Marshall Campbell landed in Durban on 28 June 1850 with his parents, William John and Agnes Campbell. They had come under the Byrne Settler scheme, which between 1849 and 1851, brought some 2 500 British emigrants to Natal.

Shortly after their arrival in Durban, Marshall's father was awarded a contract to construct the harbour's North Pier. This enabled him to buy land on the Umdhloti River, and develop his farm which he called Muckleneuk, Scots for 'great bend'. The house was designed by Frank Fleming, one of Herbert Baker's partners. By the time he died in 1865 aged 44, he had become a prominent sugar cane planter and miller.

Marshall also turned to sugar cane farming and in 1895 founded Natal Estates Limited , (Note: later to absorbed into the Tongaat Hulett company) and two years later South Africa's first sugar refinery. He married Ellen Blamey, daughter of another sugar pioneer, in 1877 and settled at Mount Edgecombe, raising a family of four children. Being active in local business and politics, he became a member of the Natal Legislative Council, later being appointed Senator for Natal. In 1915 he received a knighthood for services to the country.

A Black township outside Durban is named Kwa Mashu, Zulu for 'the place of Marshall'. Of interest is that he played a part in 1892 in introducing rickshaws to Durban, a mode of transport that has become very popular with sight-seeing tourists.

Two of his children, Margaret ('Killie') and William, were instrumental in founding The Killie Campbell Collection of Africana housed at Muckleneuk.
