= Archibald Cullen =

Sixth Bishop of Grahamstown, southern Africa

The Right Reverend Archibald Cullen
- Bishop of Grahamstown
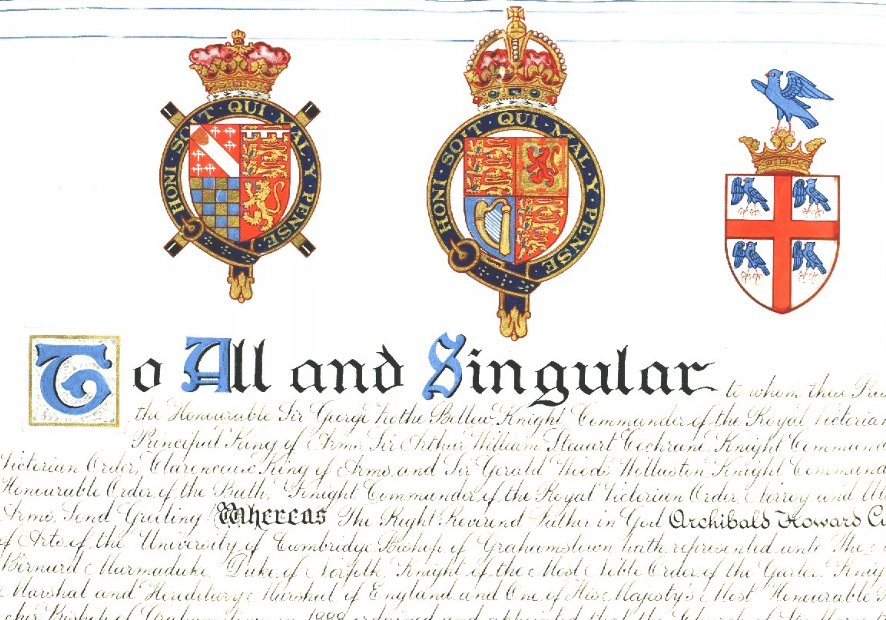
- Detail of the grant of arms to Archibald Cullen
- Church: Anglican
- Diocese: Grahamstown
- In office: 1931–1959
- Predecessor: Francis Phelps
- Successor: Robert Selby Taylor
- Previous post: Warden of St Paul's Theological College, Grahamstown

Orders
- Ordination: 1916
- Consecration: 1931

Personal details
- Born: 24 September 1887
- Died: 16 June 1968 (aged 80)

Archibald Howard Cullen (24 September 1887 – 16 June 1968) was the sixth Bishop of Grahamstown.

== Early life and education ==
He was born on 24 September 1887 to William and Louisa (née Howard). He was baptized in the Parish of St Jude, Peckham, London on 20 November 1887. His father was a Printer's Reader. Cullen was educated at Simon Langton Grammar School for Boys and subsequently at the University of London and Queens' College, Cambridge.

== Ordained ministry ==
Ordained in 1916, his first post was a curacy in Coalbrookdale. During World War I he was a Temporary Chaplain to the Forces (TCF). He was interviewed for a commission in the army chaplaincy in May, 1916. He had served in France with the 1st South African General Hospital. When peace returned he was vicar of Umzinto in the Diocese of Natal, he later became chaplain and lecturer of Wells Theological College and then Vice-Principal of Leeds Clergy School. In 1926 he became warden of St Paul's Theological College, Grahamstown until his appointment to the episcopate in 1931.

== Later life ==
He died on 16 June 1968. in South Africa.

Anglican Church of Southern Africa titles
Preceded by Francis Phelps	Bishop of Grahamstown; 1931–1959	Succeeded by Robert Selby Taylor
