= Thomas Field (Anglican priest, born 1855) =

English Anglican priest (1855–1936)

Thomas Field (9 November 1855 – 20 May 1936) was a priest in the Church of England and most notable as an educational reformer, the headmaster of two major schools.

== Life ==
He was born on 9 November 1855 to Thomas Field of Folkestone, a draper. Field was a distinguished Oxford "classic", he taught at Repton School and Harrow School from 1878 to 1886, and had been Headmaster of The King's School, Canterbury from 1886 to 1897, before becoming warden of Radley College 1897 to 1913.

He was described in those days as being tall, ponderous and swarthy, with a mighty chest and close cut black beard, a man of invincible energy.

He had an elephantine memory, whose singing was an unmelodious roar. A tale is told of Field's days at Radley - that he was left, owing to a sudden conspiratorial silence, to blare forth alone - 'I am a worm and no man'. (Psalm 22:6)

He was ordained into the Church of England in 1880. He was appointed Vicar of St. Mary's Church, Nottingham on 28 July 1913 and he held this post until 1926. He was a Canon of Southwell Minster from 1913 until 1936. He died on 20 May 1936.

Religious titles
Preceded by Hamilton Baynes	Vicar of St. Mary's Church, Nottingham; 1913–1926	Succeeded by James Gordon
