= Leonard Fisher =

British Anglican bishop (1881–1963)

The Right Reverend Leonard Fisher
- Bishop of Natal
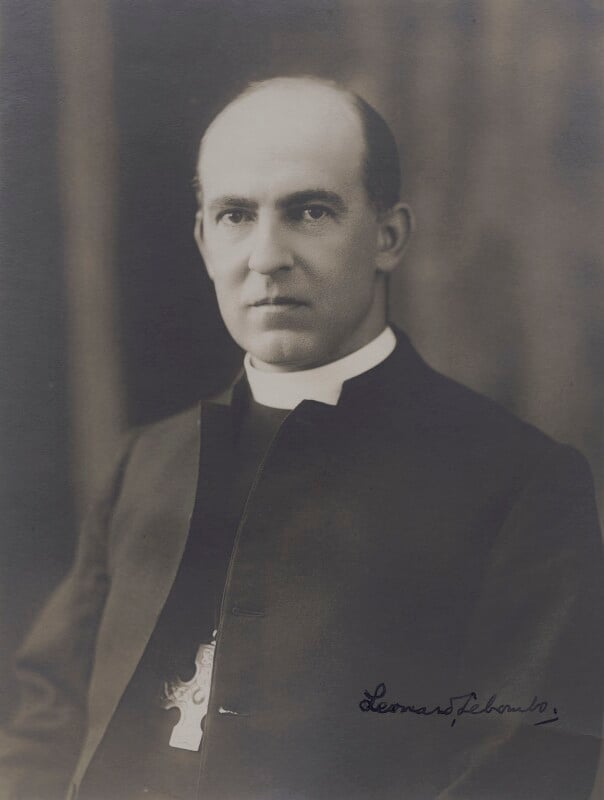
- Fisher in the 1920s

Orders
- Ordination: 1905
- Consecration: 1921

Personal details
- Born: Leonard Noel Fisher; 14 December 1881; Higham on the Hill, Leicestershire, England
- Died: 4 July 1963 (aged 81); Grahamstown, South Africa

Leonard Noel Fisher (14 December 1881 – 4 July 1963) was an Anglican bishop in the second quarter of the twentieth century. After parish work in England and military service in the First World War, he served as bishop in two African dioceses, Lebomo and Natal, before retiring in 1951.

== Life and career ==
Fisher (right) beside his brother Geoffrey, Archbishop of Canterbury, in 1950

Fisher was born at the rectory, Higham on the Hill, Leicestershire, the fifth of six sons of the Rev Henry Fisher and his wife Katherine, née Richmond. A Fisher had served as rector of Higham since 1772: Henry Fisher's father and grandfather had preceded him and Leonard's eldest brother, Legh, later held the post. Leonard's younger brother, Geoffrey, became Archbishop of Canterbury from 1945 until 1961.

Fisher was educated at Oakham School and Sidney Sussex College, Cambridge After graduation in 1903 he went on to Wells Theological College and was ordained priest in 1905.

Fisher's first post was as a curate at St Paul's, Hull after which he was Sub-Warden of St Paul's Theological College, Grahamstown, South Africa. In 1914 he returned to England to the curacy of Saltburn-by-the-Sea in the diocese of York. From 1915 to 1917 he was the first vicar of St Nicholas, Hull, and in 1917–18 a temporary World War I Chaplain. He served for three months in Plymouth and then spent almost a year in Egypt.

After the war, Fisher was appointed vicar of St Matthew Grangetown. In 1921 he was elevated to the episcopate as Bishop of Lebombo in Mozambique. According to The Times, in that position he showed "great energy and resource in dealing with the special problems of Anglican work in Portuguese East Africa" and "conspicuous qualities of tact and far-sighted administrative judgment". In 1928 he was translated to become Bishop of Natal. In the same year he married Mabel Callund of Rochester, Kent.

In June 1934 Fisher was embroiled in a dispute between Anglican congregations within Natal, some refusing to recognise the diocese; at one point he was locked out of one of the dissident churches. In 1949 he almost became the second archbishop in the family when he was narrowly defeated in the election for Archbishop of Cape Town by Geoffrey Clayton.

Ill health caused Fisher's retirement in 1951. Three years later he became an honorary canon of Grahamstown. He died, aged 81, at Brookshaw Home, Grahamstown on 4 July 1963.

== Sources ==
- Chandler, Andrew; David Hein (2012). Archbishop Fisher, 1945–1961. The Archbishops of Canterbury. London: Routledge. ISBN 978-1-4094-1233-5.
- Paton, Alan (1973). Apartheid and the Archbishop. New York: Scribners. OCLC 640056941.

Anglican Church of Southern Africa titles
Preceded by John Latimer Fuller	Bishop of Lebombo; 1921 – 1928	Succeeded by Basil William Peacey
Preceded by Frederick Samuel Baines	Bishop of Natal and Dean; 1928 – 1951	Succeeded by Thomas George Vernon Inman
