= Eddie Daniels (bishop) =

South African Anglican bishop

Edward Ronald Eddie Daniels is a South African Anglican bishop. He has been Bishop of Port Elizabeth since 2019.

Daniels was educated at Chri J. Botha School, St Paul's Theological College and Nelson Mandela University. He worked in Gqeberha from 2003 to 2019.
