= Diocese of Natal =

Anglican diocese in South Africa

Location
- Country: South Africa
- Ecclesiastical province: Southern Africa
- Archdeaconries: 15

Information
- Rite: Anglican
- Established: 1853
- Cathedral: Cathedral of the Holy Nativity

Current leadership
- Bishop: Nkosinathi Ndwandwe, diocesan bishop
- Metropolitan Archbishop: Thabo Makgoba
- Suffragan: Amos Nkosi

Website
- www.anglican-kzn.org.za

The Diocese of Natal is in the region of Natal, South Africa, the diocese has its northern boundary at the Tugela River. The episcopal leader of the diocese is the bishop of Natal.

== History ==
The history of the Diocese in the Colony of Natal starts with the consecration of John William Colenso as bishop on St Andrew's Day, 30 November 1853, at St Mary-at-Lambeth. Anglicans had been in Natal since the arrival of the first English settlers in 1824. The first missionaries came in the 1830s. In 1849, colonial chaplains were appointed for Pietermaritzburg and Durban.

In 1847 Robert Gray was appointed bishop of Cape Town and his vast diocese included the Colony of Natal. Following his visitation to Natal in 1850 Gray saw the great need for mission and for a bishop who could lead that mission. He found and recommended Colenso to be the first bishop of Natal. As with Bishop Gray, Colenso was appointed by letters patent, issued by Queen Victoria.

Bishop Colenso was highly gifted in many ways. He had a distinctive missionary theology and spoke and wrote widely on biblical criticism. He was severely critical of British political intentions towards the Zulu people. His preaching and writings brought about clashes between him and Dean Green and Bishop Gray, as well as with the leaders of the Colony.

Colenso was tried and found guilty of heresy and in 1865 was deposed as bishop. Civil law however supported him and enabled him to keep properties vested in his name, and he continued as bishop of Natal until his death in 1883. This created a schism, and in 1867 William Macrorie was appointed bishop of Maritzburg. Macrorie had to start work again, both in towns and in rural areas. New parishes and missions were established throughout the Maritzburg Diocese, which now included Alfred County to the south and Newcastle and Dundee to the north. In 1866, T. G. Fearne was Archdeacon of Durban and the Archdeaconry of Maritzburg vacant.

Following the death of Colenso in 1883 and the resignation of Macrorie in 1892 the Archbishop of Canterbury, Edward White Benson, appointed his chaplain, Arthur Hamilton Baynes, as bishop of both Anglican groups. Baynes was able to bring about a reconciliation of the two, and by the time he resigned in 1901 most of the Colenso churches had agreed to come under his jurisdiction. He was able to leave a diocese consisting of eighteen parishes, six Zulu missions, two Indian missions, three schools and one mission hospital. For all this, Baynes had the assistance of two archdeacons.

A former archdeacon, Frederick Samuel Baines, followed as bishop from 1901 to 1928. With the Anglo-Boer War behind him, and the 1910 Act giving him the Colenso properties, Baines was able to forge ahead in both the mission work as well as in the growth of parishes. The diocese experienced its greatest growth in Baines's episcopate. Fred Roach from Zululand, a Zulu language speaker, was appointed assistant bishop in 1912.

Leonard Noel Fisher was bishop from 1928 until 1951. What with the depression of the early 1930s and the Second World War this period covered severe social and economic hardships. Because of the need for providing Chaplains in the Second World War, Fisher was faced with a severe clergy shortage and little growth was attained.

Greater progress was made during the episcopate of Vernon Inman, 1951 – 1974, with several new parishes being established. He was assisted by four archdeacons and a suffragan bishop, Ken Hallowes, was appointed in 1969. This was the period which saw the onslaught of apartheid which proved to be a challenge to the church to remove racial discrimination from its structures. In 1964 the missions of the diocese were given parochial status. All incumbents were now styled rector and Black canons and archdeacons were appointed. In 1972 regional councils were introduced, their jurisdictions coinciding with the archdeaconries. In 1973 clergy stipends were given parity.

Philip Russell was Bishop from 1974 to 1981, at which time he was elected archbishop of Cape Town. In 1980 Alfred Mkhize was elected suffragan bishop to succeed Ken Hallowes who had retired that year. The main achievement during Russell's short episcopate was the uniting of the two city parishes in Pietermaritzburg and the building of the Cathedral of the Holy Nativity. Although already archbishop he was able to dedicate the cathedral on 22 November 1981.

"Michael Nuttall's episcopate, 1982 – 2000, was marked by the church's response to the struggle to achieve democratic rule in our country. At times the Natal Diocese was considered to be amongst the most violent in the world. A great deal of blood and tears have been shed, but by and large we have come through encouraged by the role the church has played in bringing about such a transition. Several parishes, church schools and United Churches were established during this period."

A second suffragan, Matthew Makhaye, was elected in 1989, and was the first bishop to be consecrated in the new cathedral, by Archbishop Desmond Tutu. The diocese now had three bishops, and each was given an episcopal area in which to minister. Alfred Mkhize retired in 1990 and was replaced by Ross Cuthbertson who resigned four years later. In 1995 Rubin Phillip was elected suffragan and on 26 August of the same year was consecrated in the cathedral by Archbishop Desmond. In 1999 Rubin Phillip was elected diocesan bishop, and on 12 February 2000 Archbishop Njongonkulu Ndungane enthroned him in the cathedral.

In the same year John Forbes retired after twenty four years as Dean of Natal, and was replaced by Fred Pitout. Bishop Matthew also retired, and so in the following year Elijah Thwala and Funginkosi Mbhele were both elected and consecrated bishops suffragan. With Bishop Elijah's retirement in 2006, Nkosinathi Ndwandwe in 2007 was elected and installed as suffragan, having been consecrated in St Cyprian's Cathedral, Kimberley. A year later Fred Pitout resigned, and in January 2009 Ndabezinhle Sibisi was installed as dean.

== Administration ==
The diocese shadows the geographical area of much of the KwaZulu Natal Province, excluding the area known as Zululand, which is its own diocese, Anglican Diocese of Zululand. As is the custom in Anglican dioceses, the diocese is divided into sub-regions, known as Archdeaconries, to facilitate better administrative and pastoral leadership processes. The archdeaconries and the parishes that fall under them are as follows:

CATHEDRAL: The Very Revd Ndabenhle Sibisi ~ Cathedral of the Holy Nativity; Southridge United Church; All Saints United Church; Eastwood United Church; Eston United Church, St Margaret; Ixopo, St John the Baptist; Pietermaritzburg, Eastwood United Church; Pietermaritzburg, St Paul's Church; Richmond with Byrne, St Mary with Baynesfield and Indaleni; Springvale, St Andrew; St David, Prestbury; Institution: St. Nicholas Diocesan School

ETHEKWINI SOUTH: Acting-Archdeacon Andrew Manning ~ Amanzimtoti, Good Shepherd; Bellair, All Saints; Bluff, St Barnabas; Chatsworth, The Epiphany; Enwabi, St Philip; Kingsburgh, St Mary; Merebank, St Michael and All Angels; Umlazi, St Augustine; Wentworth, St Gabriel; Woodlands, Montclair with Yellowwood Park; Lamontville, St Simon; Institution: St Monica's Children's Home

DURBAN CENTRAL: Archdeacon Merwyn Singh ~ Addington, Christ Church; Berea, St Thomas; Durban, St Aidan; Durban, St Cyprian; Durban, St Faith; Durban, St John–the-Divine; Durban, St Paul's; Greyville, St Mary's; Morningside, St James; Overport, Christ Church; Sydenham, St John with St Raphael; Chesterville/Cato Crest/Cato Manor; Institution: Mission to Seafarers Institution: St Martin's Children's Home

ETHEKWINI NORTH: Archdeacon Pinky Nyoni ~ Durban North, St Martin in the Field; Greenwood Park, St Columba; Kwa Mashu, Ekuvukeni; Newlands, St Peter; Northlands, St Margaret on the Hill; Ntuzuma, KwaMsindisi; Umhlanga, St Michael

INGAGANE: Archdeacon Amos Nkosi ~ Dundee, St James; Dundee, St Philip; Newcastle, Holy Trinity; Newcastle (Madadeni), St Andrew; Newcastle (Osizweni), Ekubonakhalisweni;

PIETERMARITZBURG: Archdeacon Siyothula Kahlelani ~ Edendale, St Martin; Hayfields, St Matthew; Pietermaritzburg, St Luke; Scottsville, St Alphege; Sobantu, St Christopher; York with Ravensworth, All Souls; Pietermaritzburg, Holy Angels; Sweetwaters, St Raphael; Imbali, St Mark; Camperdown, The Resurrection; Institution: Colenso House of Studies Institution: Society of Jesus Compassion Institution: St Bernard Mizeki School

PINETOWN: Acting Archdeacon Joseph Gumede~ Clermont, St Andrew; Hammarsdale, St Mary; Hillcrest, Holy Trinity; Kloof, St Agnes; Mariannridge; Christ-the-King Molweni, Valley congregations; Pinetown, St John the Baptist; Queensburgh, St Augustine; Umhlathuzana; Westville, St Elizabeth; Institution: St Mary's Diocesan School for Girls

UMNGENI: Acting-Archdeacon Forbes Maupa ~ Boston, St Michael United Church; Drakensberg, St Michael; Karkloof, St Luke; Mooi River, St Paul; Mpophomeni, The Good Shepherd; Pholela, St Mary; Kirby-Hilton, Church of the Ascension; Stoffelton, St Augustine;

UMVOTI: Acting-Archdeacon Siphosini Zulu ~ Greytown, St James; Greytown, St Peter; Inanda, Prince of Peace; KwaDukuza, St Philip; KwaDukuza, All Saints with Darnall, St Alban; Umhlali, All Souls; Maidstone, All Saints; Phoenix, Holy Trinity; Tongaat, St John

UTHUKELA: Archdeacon Sboniso Khanyile ~ Estcourt, St Barnabas' Estcourt, St Matthew; Steadville, St John; Klip River, St Chad; Ladysmith, All Saints

UMZIMKHULU: Archdeacon Nkosinami Nkomonde ~ Ezimbokodweni; Harding, St James; Isipingo, St James; Magabheni, St Bride; Margate, St Margaret of Antioch; Ngcwayi, St Laurence; Port Shepstone, St Katharine; Scottburgh, St Paul with Umkomaas, Christ Church; Umzimkulwana, St Luke; Umzinto, St Patrick; Institution: Hlanganani Preparatory School;

== List of bishops ==
Diocesan bishops
From	Until	Incumbent	Notes
1853	1883	John Colenso	William Macrorie consecrated rival Bishop of Maritzburg from 1868 to 1892
1883	1893	vacant	William Macrorie consecrated rival Bishop of Maritzburg from 1868 to 1892
1893	1901	Hamilton Baynes	
1901	1928	Samuel Baines	
1928	1951	Leonard Fisher	Translated from Lebombo.
1951	1974	Vernon Inman	
1974	1982	Philip Russell	Translated from Port Elizabeth; translated to Cape Town.
1982	1999	Michael Nuttall	Translated from Pretoria.
1999	2015	Rubin Phillip	
2015	2019	Dino Gabriel	Translated from Zululand, resigned September 2019.
2021		Nkosinathi Ndwandwe	Translated from Mthatha

Bishops suffragan
From	Until	Incumbent	Notes
1912	1922	Fred Roach	
1969	1980	Kenneth Bernard Hallowes	
1980	1990	Alfred Mkhize	
1989	2000	Matthew Mandlenkosi Makhaye	
1990	1994	Ross Gray Cuthbertson	"Overseas Appointments". Church Times. No. 6664. 2 November 1990. p. 5. ISSN 0009-658X – via UK Press Online archives.
2001	2006	Elijah Robert Thwala	
2001	2010	Funginkosi Niclaus Mbhele	
2007	2017	Nkosinathi Ndwandwe	translated to Mthatha
2011	2019	Tsietsi Edward Seleoane	translated to Umzimvubu
2025		Amos Nkosi	

Assistant bishops
From	Until	Incumbent	Notes
1961	1967	Archibald Howard Cullen	
1961	1971	Edward Francis Paget	
1971	1987	Thomas William Stainton	
