= Ken Hallowes =

British Anglican priest

The Right Reverend Kenneth Bernard Hallowes
- suffragan bishop
- Church: Church of England
- Diocese: Diocese of Natal, South Africa
- Elected: 1969
- Term ended: 1981

Orders
- Ordination: 1947

Personal details
- Born: 1913
- Died: 10 July 1995 Pietermaritzburg
- Denomination: Anglican

Kenneth Bernard Hallowes (1913 – 10 July 1995) was an Anglican bishop in South Africa in the last third of the 20th Century.

Hallowes was educated at St Edmund Hall, Oxford and during World War II he served as an officer with the Royal Armoured Corps When peace returned he studied for the priesthood at Westcott House, Cambridge; and was ordained in 1947. He was vice principal of St Chad's College, Ladysmith from 1947 to 1954; priest in charge of Springvale from 1952 to 1964; rector of St Mark, Pietermaritzburg from 1966 to 1969; and suffragan bishop of Natal from 1969 until 1981. Hallowes died at home in Pietermaritzburg.
