= Bruce Evans (bishop) =

The Right Reverend Bruce Evans
- Bishop of Port Elizabeth
- Church: Anglican
- Diocese: Port Elizabeth
- In office: 1975 – 1993
- Predecessor: Philip Russell
- Successor: Eric Pike

Orders
- Ordination: 1957

Personal details
- Born: 10 November 1929
- Died: 25 August 1993 (aged 63) Port Elizabeth

Bruce Read Evans (1929 – 1993) was an Anglican bishop and author in the 20th century.

He was educated at King Edward School, Johannesburg and the University of the Witwatersrand and ordained in 1957. He held curacies at Holy Trinity, Redhill, Surrey and St Paul's, Portman Square. He was curate-in charge at St Luke's, Diep River, Cape. He held incumbencies at Christ Church, Kenilworth, Cape Town and St John's, Wynberg, Cape Town, before his ordination to the episcopate as the second Bishop of Port Elizabeth. He died in post.

== Published works ==
Among other books, he wrote I Will Heal their Land, 1974; The Earth is the Lord’s, 1975; Facing the New Challenges, 1978; and The Church and the Alternative Society, 1979

== Sources ==
Anglican Communion titles
Preceded by Philip Welsford Richmond Russell	Bishop of Port Elizabeth; 1975-1993	Succeeded by Eric Pike
