= Bethlehem Nopece =

South African Anglican bishop (born 1950)

The Right Reverend Bethlehem Nopece
- retired bishop of Port Elizabeth
- Church: Anglican
- See: Diocese of Port Elizabeth
- In office: 2001-2018
- Predecessor: Eric Pike
- Previous post: Suffragan Bishop of Grahamstown

Orders
- Consecration: 1998 by Njongonkulu Ndungane

Personal details
- Born: 1950 (age 75–76)

Nceba Bethlehem Nopece (born 1950) is a South African Anglican bishop. He was the bishop of Port Elizabeth in the Anglican Church of Southern Africa from 2001 to 2018. He is a theological conservative, the leading name of the Anglican realignment in his church and also the chairman of the Fellowship of Confessing Anglicans in South Africa, launched in 2009.

== Ecclesiastical career ==
Nopece was ordained a deacon in 1978. He gained a diploma in theology at St. Bede's College. He also obtained a BTh at the University of South Africa, in Pretoria, and a master's degree in theology at the University of Glasgow in 1985. He was a lecturer at St. Bede's College. He was appointed as archdeacon of Umtata in 1992 and suffragan bishop of Grahamstown in January 1998. He was consecrated as bishop of the Diocese of Port Elizabeth on 28 July 2001. In November 2017 he announced his retirement, which became effective on 29 July 2018.

== Role in the Anglican realignment ==
Nopece upholds the traditional Anglican stance on homosexuality and condemned the consecration in 2003 of Gene Robinson, the first non-celibate gay bishop of the Episcopal Church, as a defiant act to the Anglican Communion. In his official statement afterwards, he declared that "The consecration as bishop of Gene Robinson, a man living openly in a homosexual relationship with another man in blatant disregard for the teaching of Holy Scripture and the position of the Anglican Communion (expressed in Lambeth resolution 1;10 of 1998), is not an action to be celebrated, but a deep and grievous error to be mourned." He also stated that "We want to emphasise that our protest is not against homosexually inclined persons, but rather against a section of Church leadership which, through this consecration, is attempting to change the fundamental teachings of the Christian faith." He criticized Archbishop Njongonkulu Ndungane support for the consecration, stating that "The Archbishop of Cape Town has not spoken on behalf of the faithful of this Province, as he has not heard the mind of the Church fully through deliberations of its general councils and Synods on this issue."

Nopece was the only South African bishop to attend the GAFCON meeting in Jerusalem in June 2008. In response to the Diocese of Cape Town resolution, passed on 22 August 2009, asking the Anglican Church of Southern Africa bishops to give pastoral guidelines for gay members of the church who lived in "covenanted partnerships", Nopece decided to launch the Fellowship of Confessing Anglicans in South Africa on 3 September 2009 at St. John's Church, Port Elizabeth. He hosted the event, which was attended by a retired Archbishop of Kenya, Benjamin Nzimbi, one of the GAFCON founding primates. From all over the Anglican Communion, greetings were sent by archbishops Peter Akinola of Nigeria, Peter Jensen of the Anglican Diocese of Sydney, Australia, Robert Duncan of the Anglican Church in North America, a former Archbishop of Canterbury, George Carey, and Bishop Michael Nazir-Ali from the Diocese of Rochester in England.

Nopece led the seven-member Southern African delegation that participated at the Fellowship of Confessing Anglicans meeting in London, England, at 23 – 27 April 2012. He once again led his province ten-members delegation, which included Bishop Nathaniel Nakwatumbah of Namibia, to GAFCON II, held in Nairobi, Kenya, from 21 to 26 October 2013. Nopece led the province's delegation to GAFCON III, held in Jerusalem, on 17–22 June 2018, comprised by 18 members, 16 from South Africa, Bishop Vicente Msosa, of the Anglican Diocese of Niassa, as the only delegate from Mozambique, and another one from Namibia.

Anglican Church of Southern Africa titles
Preceded by Eric Pike	Bishop of Port Elizabeth; 2001 – 2018	Succeeded by Eddie Daniels
