= Cedara College of Agriculture =

Agricultural university in Howick, South Africa

Coordinates: 29°32′52.1196″S 30°15′58.1904″E

Cedara College of Agriculture is an agricultural college and research station near Howick, KwaZulu-Natal, South Africa, founded partly by Thomas Robertson Sim. The foundation stone of the "School of Agriculture and Forestry" was laid on 28 April 1905. The original prospectus advertised lectures in Forestry, Horticulture, Dairying, Veterinary Science, Chemistry, Elementary Mathematics, Bookkeeping, Farm Surveying, Zoology, and Fish Husbandry.

== Programs ==
As of 2019, Cedara College (Agricultural Training Institute) offers a three-year National Diploma in Agricultural Management where students are able to specialize in either Animal Production or Crop Production. It provides vocational training in cultivated pastures, dairying, beef, small stock, poultry, pigs and fodder crops, agronomy, game, vegetables, and fruit production. In a joint venture, the College also hosts the BAgric (Agricultural Extension & Rural Resource Management) programme offered by UKZN.

Cedara college also offer short courses through the Agricultural Skills Development unit (ASD). This unit offers vocational education and training programs to facilitate the linkage between structured learning and work experience in order to obtain registered qualification. As of 2019, ASD offers:

- Goat production skills program
- Broiler production skills program
- Layer production skills program
- Pig production skills program
- Beef production skills program
- Advanced animal production skills program
- Vegetable production skills program
- Plant production skills program

== Facilities ==
A 60-ha area commonly known as "College Farm" has been set aside primarily for training students in animal husbandry and general farming practices. A beef herd and a sheep flock are kept specifically to train students in aspects of basic veterinary techniques, beef management practices (dehorning, castration, identification) and sheep management practices (foot care, castration, tail docking, identification). A small pig unit and small dairy are also kept for student training purposes. A broiler and layer unit meet the demands of poultry production practicals. A fully equipped laboratory is used for crop- and animal-related teaching and learning.
