= Samuel Baines =

British-born Anglican bishop (1858–1939)

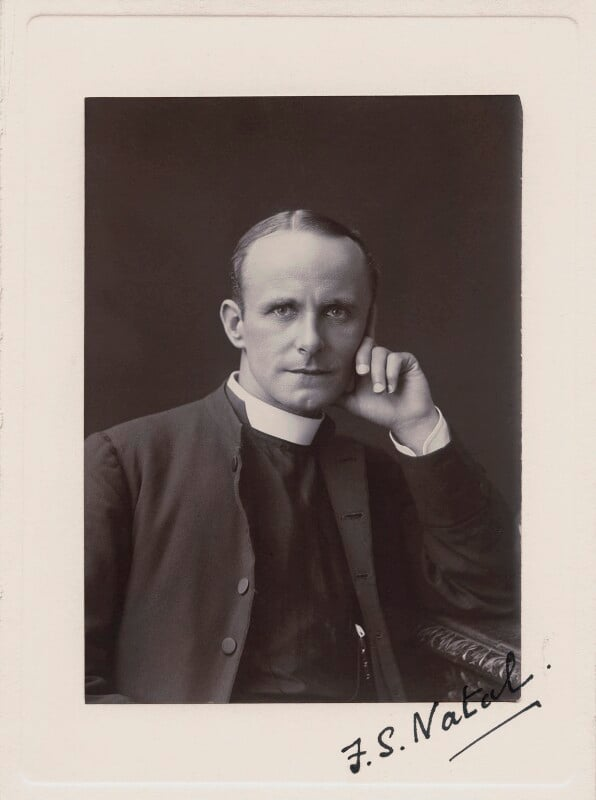
- Born: Frederick Samuel Baines; 5 January 1858; Shoreham-by-Sea
- Died: 17 November 1939 (aged 81); Hove
- Alma mater: Winchester College; University College, Oxford
- Position held: Bishop of Natal (1901–1928)

Frederick Samuel Baines (1858–1939) was an Anglican bishop.

He was educated at Winchester and University College, Oxford, and ordained in 1882. His first post was as Curate at Holy Trinity, Leeds, after which he was Vicar of St Cuthbert, Hunslet. Later he was Archdeacon of Durban and then Secretary of the Council for Service Abroad. In 1901 he was elevated to the episcopate as Bishop of Natal and served the diocese for twenty-eight years. He died in office on 17 November 1939.

Baines founded Cordwalles Preparatory School in 1912.

== Notes ==
Anglican Church of Southern Africa titles
Preceded by Arthur Hamilton Baynes	Bishop of Natal; 1901 – 1928	Succeeded by Leonard Noel Fisher
