= Anglican Diocese of Port Elizabeth =

Anglican diocese in South Africa

Diocese of Port Elizabeth
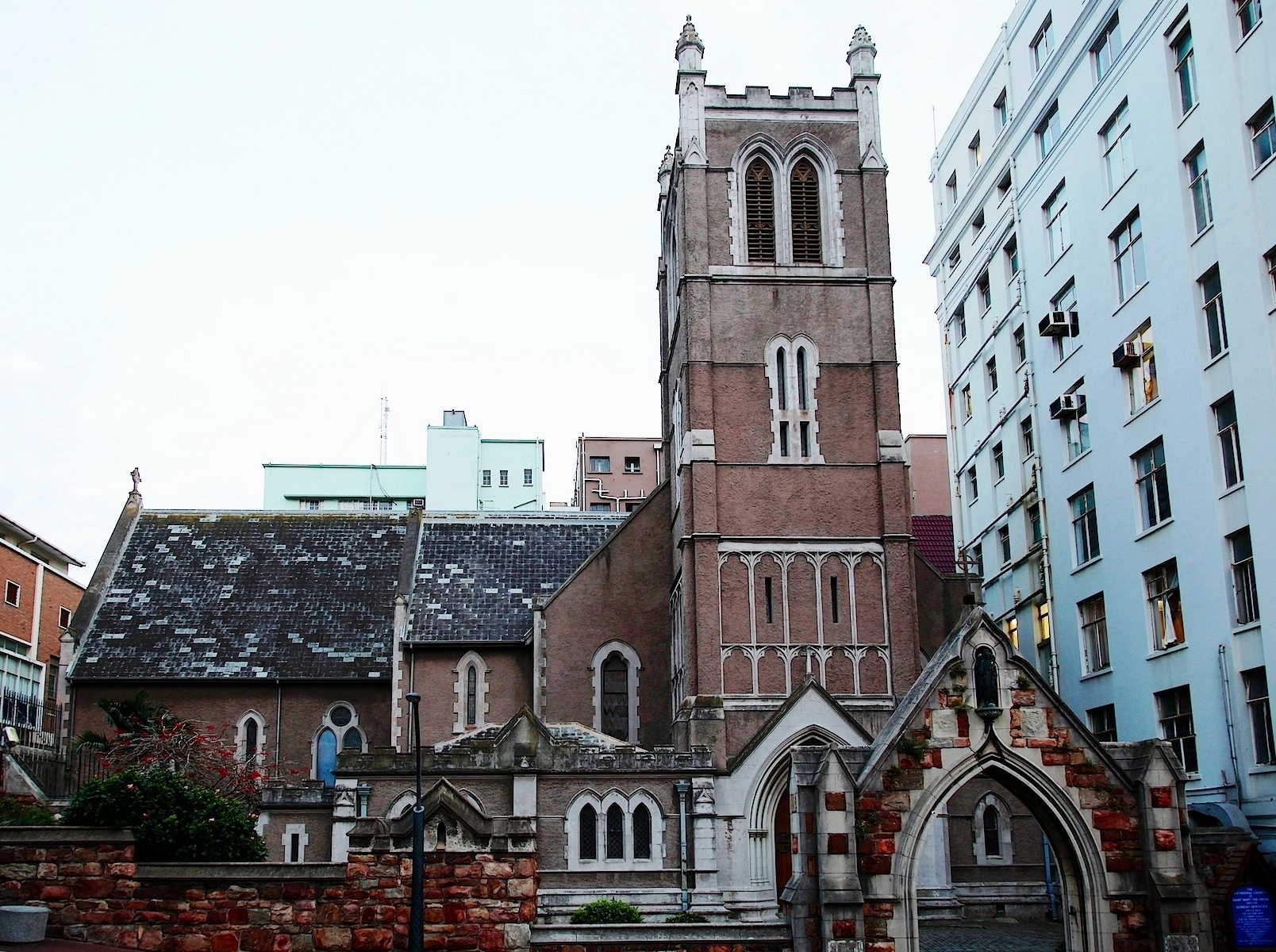
- St Mary's Cathedral, Gqeberha

- Coat of arms

Location
- Ecclesiastical province: Anglican Church of Southern Africa

Statistics
- Parishes: 44

Information
- Rite: Anglican
- Cathedral: The Cathedral Church of St Mary the Virgin, Gqeberha

Current leadership
- Bishop: vacant

Website
- www.anglicandiocesepe.org.za

The Diocese of Port Elizabeth is a diocese in Port Elizabeth (Gqeberha). The diocese is in the Anglican Church of Southern Africa. The diocese was founded in 1970.

== History ==
The British garrison of Gqeberha saw the arrival of 500 settlers in 1825, which included Francis McClelland, who was appointed the same year Colonial Chaplain. It was also laid the foundation stone of the Collegiate Church of St. Mary the Virgin, who only would be opened for worship in 1832. The Anglican Diocese of Port Elizabeth was created in 1970, being his first bishop, Philip Russell, until 1974. The diocese supported the anti-apartheid campaign under his tenure and the one of his successor, Bruce Evans. He was followed by Eric Pike, who would be in office from 1993 to 2001. Bethlehem Nopece was elected as the first black bishop of the diocese in 2001, which he was until 29 July 2018.

== List of bishops ==
- Philip Russell, 1970-1974
- Bruce Read Evans, 1975-1993
- Eric Pike, 1993-2001
- Bethlehem Nopece, 2001–2018
- Eddie Daniels, 2019-2024

== Coat of arms ==
The diocese registered a coat of arms at the Bureau of Heraldry in 1977 : Argent, on a cross Gules, between in dexter chief an anchor, in sinister chief a cross moline, in dexter base a clay pot and in sinister base a triangle Sable voided of the field, a lamb couchant proper, the shield ensigned with a mitre proper.

== Anglican realignment ==
The diocese is theologically conservative. Bishop Bethlehem Nopece attended the GAFCON meetings in 2008, 2013 and 2018, and was the founder and is the current chairman of the Fellowship of Confessing Anglicans of South Africa. The Synod of the diocese, held in November 2017, passed unanimously a motion that stated that any future nominee for local bishop must affirm the Jerusalem Declaration, issued at the Global Anglican Future Conference, in Jerusalem, in June 2008.
