= Africana (artifacts) =

Africana are materials such as books, documents, artifacts, or artistic or literary works of any of the nations of Africa which reflect on the geographical, historical, or cultural development of Africa.

Even though it can include material relating to any region in Africa, it is usually focused on Southern African history.

== Notable Africana collections ==
- Brenthurst Library
- Duggan-Cronin Gallery
- Killie Campbell Africana Library
- MuseuMAfricA

== Notable Africana suppliers ==
- Clarke's Bookshop

== Bibliography ==
- Ensiklopedie van die wêreld, deel 1. Stellenbosch: Albertyn, 1992. ISBN 0-949948-18-7
- Godfrey, Denis (September 1973). "Collecting Africana". Lantern. 23 (1).
- Schumann, Annie (September 1968). "J.C.N. Humphreys – Africana collector of distinction". Lantern. 18 (1).
- Smith, Anna (September 1953). "The Africana Museum Johannesburg". Lantern. 3 (2).
- Standard Encyclopaedia of Southern Africa, part 1. Cape Town: Nasou, 1970.
- Wagener, F.J. (April 1957). "Africana". Lantern. 6 (4).
