= Fred Roach =

Frederick Roach (1856–1922) was an Anglican bishop in South Africa in the first quarter of the 20th Century.

Roach was educated at Cheltenham Training College and ordained in 1886. He served at Kwamagwaza, Isandhlwana and Etalaneni before becoming Archdeacon of Eshowe in 1905. In 1913 he became Assistant Bishop of Natal, a post he held until his death.
