= Hamilton Baynes =

The Right Reverend Arthur Baynes
- Bishop of Natal
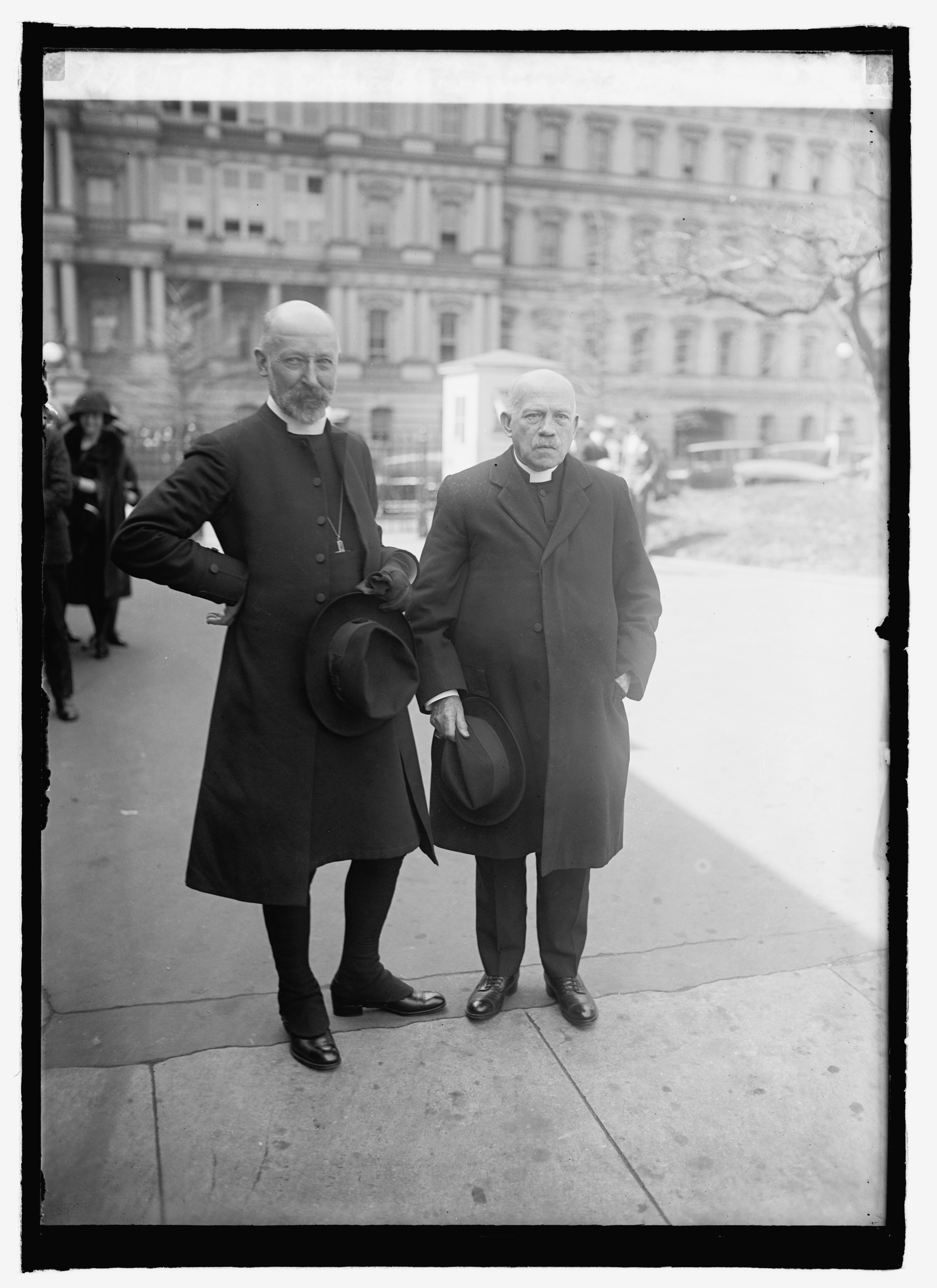
- Baynes (left)
- Church: Anglican Church of Southern Africa
- Appointed: 1893

Orders
- Consecration: 29 September 1893

Personal details
- Born: Arthur Hamilton Baynes; 23 March 1854
- Died: 30 June 1942 (aged 88)

Arthur Hamilton Baynes (23 March 1854 – 30 June 1942) was a Church of England priest and Bishop of Natal and Maritzburg (Note: He was made Bishop of Maritzburg as a consequence of the Colenso affair) from 1893 to 1901.

== Life ==
He was born in Lewisham, the eldest son of Joseph Ash Baynes and Mary Elizabeth Beard, of Blackheath, Kent. He matriculated in 1875 at Balliol College, Oxford and graduated B.A. at Oriel College in 1879, M.A. in 1882.

Following ordination as deacon in 1881 and priest in 1882, Baynes was curate at St Mary's Church, Nottingham, from 1881 to 1884. He became vicar of St James's Church, Nottingham in 1884, remaining there to 1888. He was Domestic Chaplain to the Archbishop of Canterbury, E. W. Benson, from 1888 to 1892. In 1893 he was appointed to the bishopric of Natal. During the Boer War, while Bishop of Natal, he was an army chaplain.

After returning to England from Natal, Baynes was vicar of St Mary's Church, Nottingham, and also an Assistant Bishop of Southwell and an honorary canon of Southwell Minster from 1905 until 1913. During the First World War he was again an army chaplain. From 1913, he was incumbent of Birmingham Cathedral, first as vicar, then (from 1931) as Provost of Birmingham (and an Assistant Bishop of Birmingham throughout) until his retirement in 1937.

Gaynes married in 1894 Cecilia Crompton (1870–1919), daughter of John Lake Crompton, Canon of Natal, and with her had five children; Thomas born 1896, Colin born 1899, Mary born 1901, St. Clair born 1903 and Patrick born 1907. Cecilia died in 1919 and in 1923 he married Mary Burnett. There were no children of his second marriage.

== Notes and references ==
Anglican Church of Southern Africa titles
Preceded by William Macrorie	Bishop of Maritzburg; 1892–1893	Sees of Maritzburg and Natal reunited
Preceded by John Colenso	Bishop of Natal; 1893–1901	Succeeded by Samuel Baines
Church of England titles
Preceded by John Richardson	Vicar of St Mary's Church, Nottingham; 1901–1913	Succeeded by Thomas Field
Preceded by himself as Vicar	Provost of Birmingham; 1931–1937	Succeeded by Harold Richards
