= Grace College, Hilton =

High school in Hilton, South Africa

Coordinates: 29.53710°S 30.29811°E

Grace College
- 2 Hilton College road, Hilton, KwaZulu-Natal; South Africa

Information
- Type: Co-educational
- Motto: My utmost for his highest
- Religious affiliation: Christian
- Founded: 1999
- Grades: 8–12
- Enrollment: 262
- Education system: Independent
- Language: English
- Campus size: 22 hectare
- Colours: Blue and white
- Accreditation: Independent Examinations Board
- Headmaster: Henko Jansen (since 2023)
- Website: www.gracecollege.co.za

Grace College is a private, co-educational, Christian high school located in Hilton, KwaZulu-Natal in South Africa.

== Athletic houses ==
- Ararat.
- Carmel.
- Sinai.
