= Nkosinathi Ndwandwe =

Hummingfield Charles Nkosinathi Ndwandwe (born 29 January 1959) is a South African Anglican bishop: he has been Bishop of Mthatha since 2017. On 9 July 2021 he was elected to be the diocesan bishop of the Diocese of Natal, by an electoral college of bishops for the Province of Southern Africa, meeting online.

Ndwandwe was born in Nongoma and ordained in 1983. He was previously Suffragan Bishop of Natal.

== Notes ==
Anglican Church of Southern Africa titles
Preceded by Elijah Robert Thwala	Bishop suffragan of Natal; 2007-2017	not replaced
Preceded by Sitembele Mzamane	Bishop of Mthatha; 2017-2021	Succeeded by Thembinkosi Jemuel Ngombane
Preceded by Dino Gabriel	Bishop (elect) of Natal; 2021–	
