= Michael Nuttall =

South African Anglican bishop (born 1934)

The Right Reverend Michael Nuttal
- Former Bishop of Natal
- Church: Anglican
- Province: Southern Africa
- Diocese: Natal
- In office: 1982–1999
- Predecessor: Philip Russell
- Successor: Rubin Phillip
- Previous post: Bishop of Pretoria

Orders
- Ordination: 1965
- Consecration: 1975

Personal details
- Born: 3 April 1934 (age 92)

Michael Nuttall (born 3 April 1934) is a former South African Anglican bishop and author.

He was educated at Maritzburg College, the University of Natal and Rhodes University and ordained in 1965. His first post was as a curate at Grahamstown Cathedral where he was later to return as Dean. In 1975 he was elevated to the episcopate as Bishop of Pretoria. After seven years he was translated to Natal. He was Bishop of Natal until 2000. He continues to serve the Church in retirement.

== Publications ==
Nuttall has written and contributed to a number of works including:

- René De Villiers, ed. (1972). "Religion". Better than they knew. Purnell. p. 191. ISBN 9780360001626.
- Authority in the Anglican Communion 1987
- Prayerfulness in the Spirit 2002
- John Suggit & Mandy Goedhals, ed. (1998). Change and challenge: essays commemorating the 150th anniversary of the arrival of Robert Gray as first bishop of Cape Town [20th February 1848). Church of the Province of Southern Africa. p. 55. ISBN 978-0-9584213-2-4.
- Number two to Tutu: a memoir. Cluster. 2003. ISBN 978-1-875053-34-6.
- Nuttall, Michael. "Receiving Communion from the Hands of a Woman Priest: A Milestone in the Life of the Church of the Province of Southern Africa." Women Hold Up Half The Sky: Women in the Church in Southern Africa (1991): 267–273.
- Charles Hefling & Cynthia Shattuck, ed. (2006). "The Province of Southern Africa". The Oxford Guide to The Book of Common Prayer : A Worldwide Survey: A Worldwide Survey. Oxford University Press. ISBN 978-0-19-972389-8.

Anglican Church of Southern Africa titles
Preceded by Kenneth Oram	Dean of Grahamstown; 1975–1975	Succeeded by Godfrey Ashby
Preceded by Edward Knapp-Fisher	Bishop of Pretoria; 1975–1982	Succeeded by Richard Austin Kraft
Preceded by Philip Russell	Bishop of Natal; 1982–1999	Succeeded by Rubin Phillip
