= Philip Russell (bishop) =

South African Anglican bishop

The Most Reverend Philip Russell MBE
- Archbishop of Cape Town; Primate of the Anglican Church of Southern Africa
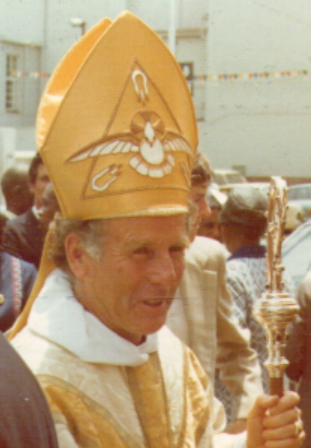
- Church: Anglican
- Province: Southern Africa
- Diocese: Cape Town
- See: Cape Town
- In office: 1981–1986
- Predecessor: Bill B. Burnett
- Successor: Desmond Tutu
- Previous post: Bishop of Natal

Orders
- Ordination: 1981

Personal details
- Born: 21 October 1919 Cowies Hill, South Africa
- Died: 25 July 2013 (aged 93) Adelaide, Australia

Philip Welsford Richmond Russell, MBE (21 October 1919 – 25 July 2013) was a South African Anglican bishop.

== Personal life ==
Russell was born 21 October 1919 in Cowies Hill, South Africa and died 25 July 2013 in Adelaide, Australia.

He was educated in Durban at Clifton Preparatory School and Durban High School. Having trained as a quantity surveyor, he served in World War II as part of a bomb disposal unit in the South African Engineering Corps. He was awarded the MBE in 1943 for his service. It was during this time he felt called to the priesthood. He studied at Rhodes University and St Paul's Theological College in Grahamstown. He was ordained as a deacon in 1940 and as a priest in 1941.

He met fellow-South African Eirene Hogarth in Rome in 1944, whom he married in 1945 at the Garrison Church, Foggia, Italy. Together they had four children, Susan, June, Pauline and Christopher. After the death of his wife in 2001, Russell moved to Adelaide, Australia, where three of his four children had settled.

== Church career ==
After World War II he served in various parishes in the Diocese of Natal including Greytown, Ladysmith, Kloof and Pinetown. He was consecrated bishop, and served as suffragan bishop of Cape Town from 1966 to 1970.

From 1970 to 1974 he was the bishop of the new Anglican Diocese of Port Elizabeth and, from 1974 to 1981, he was Bishop of Natal.

In 1980 he was named Archbishop of Cape Town by the Episcopal Synod of the Anglican Church after the Diocese of Cape Town was unable to decide between Desmond Tutu and Michael Nuttall, the then Bishop of Pretoria. He retired on 31 August 1986, being succeeded by Desmond Tutu. Philip had the title "Archbishop Emeritus" conferred on him by the Synod of Bishops in 1997.

== Apartheid ==
As a parish priest in country towns, he started expressing his doubts about Apartheid in sermons. In 1962 he saw black people and white people sitting together and talking for the first time, while at a church council. He served on the council of Diakonia, an ecumenical body which was very active in both the spiritual and social service sides of Christian life. He was an ardent supporter of human rights through the South African Institute of Race Relations and the Civil Rights League. His ecumenical enthusiasm led him to an active involvement in Diakonia, Vuleka Trust, the South African Council of Churches and the World Council of Churches.

== Publications ==
- Tools for the Job. Church of the Province of Southern Africa. 1974. ISBN 978-0-86881-001-0. with Lawrence Bekisisa Zulu

Anglican Church of Southern Africa titles
New diocese	Bishop of Port Elizabeth; 1970–1974	Succeeded by Bruce Read Evans
Preceded by Vernon Inman	Bishop of Natal; 1974–1981	Succeeded by Michael Nuttall
Preceded by Bill Burnett	Archbishop of Cape Town; 1981–1986	Succeeded by Desmond Tutu
