= John Colenso =

British Anglican cleric and mathematician (1814–1883)

The Right Reverend John William Colenso
- Bishop of Natal
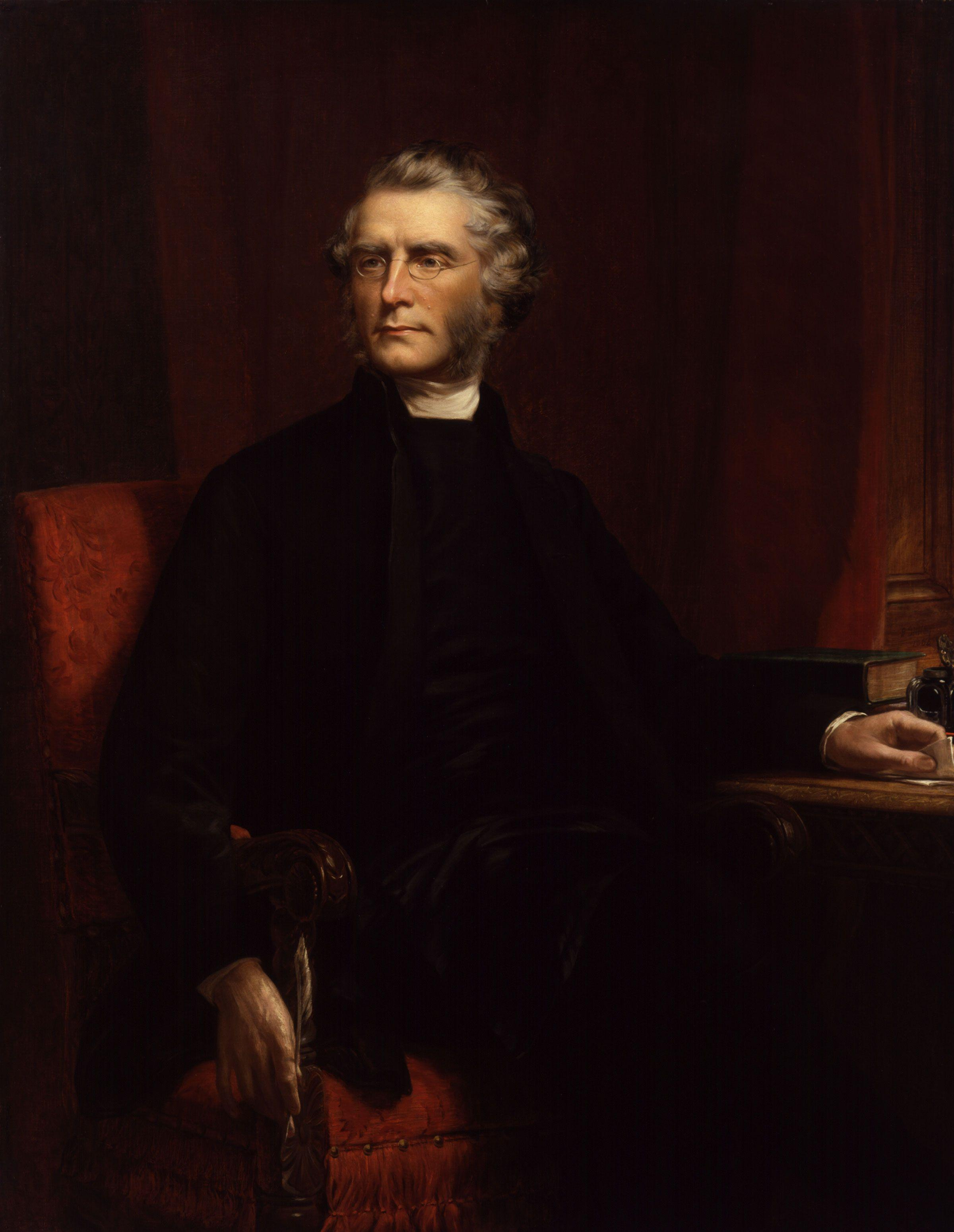
- Portrait by Samuel Sidley (1866)
- Church: Church of England
- See: Natal
- In office: 1853 – 20 June 1883
- Predecessor: none
- Successor: Hamilton Baynes
- Previous post: Rector of Forncett St Mary

Personal details
- Born: 24 January 1814 St Austell, Cornwall, England
- Died: 20 June 1883 (aged 69) Durban, Natal Colony

John William Colenso (24 January 1814 – 20 June 1883) was a Cornish cleric and mathematician, defender of the Zulu people, and biblical scholar, who served as the first Bishop of Natal. He was a scholar of the Zulu language. In his role as an Anglican theologian, Colenso is now remembered for views of the Bible that set off intense controversy.

== Early life and education ==
Colenso was born at St Austell, Cornwall, on 24 January 1814 the son of John William Colenso and Mary Ann Blackmore. His surname is Cornish. It may originate from Colenso in the parish of St Hilary or Madron, near Penzance in West Cornwall. It is a place name from the Cornish language Kelyn dhu, meaning "black hollies". His father (John William Colenso) invested his capital into a mineral works in Pentewan, Cornwall. The speculation proved to be ruinous when the investment was lost following a sea flood. His cousin William Colenso was a missionary in New Zealand.

Family financial problems meant that Colenso had to take a job as an usher in a private school before he could attend university. These earnings and a loan of £30 raised by his relatives paid for his first year at St John's College, Cambridge where he was a sizar. Showing talent in mathematics, in 1836 he was Second Wrangler and Smith's Prizeman at the University of Cambridge, and in 1837 he became a fellow of St John's. Two years later he went to Harrow School as mathematical tutor and housemaster, but the step proved an unfortunate one. The school was at its lowest ebb, and Colenso not only had few pupils, but lost most of his property in a fire. He returned to Cambridge burdened by an enormous debt of £5,000. However, within a relatively short period he paid off this debt by diligent tutoring and the sale to Longmans of his copyright interest in the highly successful and widely read manuals he had written on algebra (in 1841) and arithmetic (in 1843).

== Career ==
Colenso's early theological thinking was heavily influenced by F. D. Maurice to whom he was introduced by his wife and by Samuel Taylor Coleridge.

In 1846 he became rector of Forncett St Mary, Norfolk, and in 1853 he was recruited by the Bishop of Cape Town, Robert Gray, to be the first Bishop of Natal. He was consecrated as bishop on St Andrew's Day, 30 November 1853, at St Mary-at-Lambeth.

=== Life in Africa ===
Colenso was a significant figure in the history of the published word in 19th-century South Africa. He first wrote a short but vivid account of his initial journeying in Natal, Ten Weeks in Natal: A Journal of a First Tour of Visitation Among the Colonists and Zulu Kafirs of Natal. Using the printing press he brought to his missionary station at Ekukhanyeni in Natal, and with William Ngidi he published the first Zulu Grammar and English/Zulu dictionary. His 1859 journey across Zululand to visit Mpande (the then Zulu King) and meet with Cetshwayo (Mpande's son and the Zulu King at the time of the Zulu War) was recorded in his book First Steps of the Zulu Mission. The same journey was also described in the first book written by native South Africans in Zulu – Three Native Accounts by Magema Fuze, Ndiyane and William Ngidi. He also translated the New Testament and other portions of Scripture into Zulu.

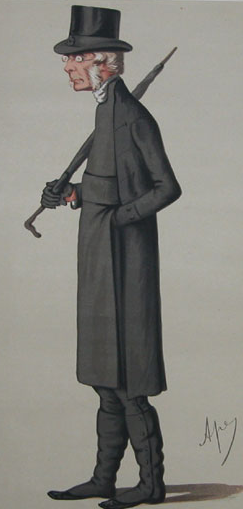
John William Colenso, by Carlo Pellegrini, 1874

=== Religious debate ===
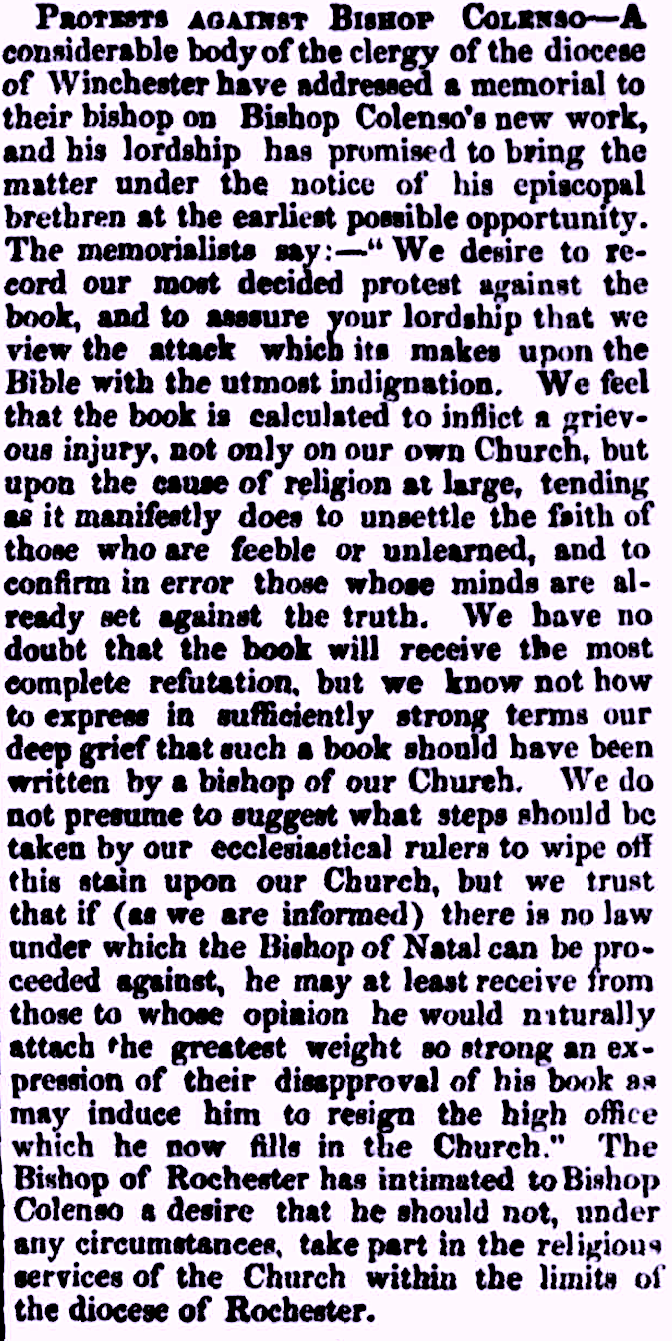
Anglican Clerics' protests against Bishop Colenso — reprinted from The Times, 18 December 1862.

Through the influence of his talented and well-educated wife, Sarah Frances Bunyon, Colenso became one of only a handful of theologians to embrace Frederick Denison Maurice, who was raised a Unitarian but joined the Church of England to help it "purify and elevate the mind of the nation". Before his missionary career, Colenso's volume of sermons dedicated to Maurice signalled the critical approach he would later apply to biblical interpretation and the baleful impact on native Africans of colonial expansion in southern Africa.

Colenso first courted controversy with the publication in 1855 of his Remarks on the Proper Treatment of Polygamy, one of the most cogent Christian-based arguments for tolerance of polygamy.

Colenso's experiences in Natal informed his development as a religious thinker. In his commentary on St Paul's Epistle to the Romans (1861), he countered the doctrine of eternal punishment and the contention that Holy Communion was a condition to salvation. He also questioned the presence of a distinctly Christian Church in Rome, asking: "Was there, in fact, any Christian Church at Rome at all, at this time, distinct and definitely marked off from the Jewish community? There would seem to have been none whatever ..." Colenso, as a missionary, would not preach that the ancestors of newly Christianised Africans were condemned to eternal damnation.

The thought-provoking questions put to him by students at his missionary station encouraged him to re-examine the contents of the Pentateuch and the Book of Joshua and question whether certain sections of these books (e.g., Noah's Ark, the Deluge, the Crossing of the Red Sea, the Exodus, etc.), should be understood as literally or historically accurate. His conclusions, positive and negative, were published in a series of treatises on the Pentateuch and the Book of Joshua, from 1862 to 1879. The publication of these volumes created a scandal in England and were the cause of a number of counterblasts from those (clergy and laity alike) who refused to countenance the possibility of biblical fallibility. Colenso's work attracted the notice of biblical scholars on the continent such as Abraham Kuenen and played an important role in the development of Old Testament criticism in Britain; not only in relation to the theological/doctrinal issues of the Bible's inerrancy, infallibility, and literalism (rather than allegorism), and not only in relation to what many considered to be its scientific, historical, geographical, and chronological inaccuracies, and the consequent controversies about the age of the Earth, but, also, in relation to the precise accuracy of the translations-of-the-original presented in particular versions, as well as the separate question of how the Bible itself had developed — and which parts (when written, and by whom) of which particular texts (and in what order) should be included in the Bible itself.

Colenso's biblical criticism and his high-minded views about the treatment of African natives created a frenzy of alarm and opposition from the High Church party in South Africa and in England. As controversy raged in England, the South African bishops headed by Bishop Robert Gray pronounced Colenso's deposition in December 1863. Colenso, who had refused to appear before this tribunal otherwise than by sending a proxy protest (delivered by his friend Wilhelm Bleek), appealed to the Judicial Committee of the Privy Council in London. The Privy Council eventually decided that the Bishop of Cape Town had no coercive jurisdiction and no authority to interfere with the Bishop of Natal. In view of this finding that Gray's pronouncement had been made ultra vires, there need be no judicial opinion given upon the allegations of heresy made against Colenso. The first Lambeth Conference was convened in 1867 to address concerns raised by the Privy Council's decision in favour of Colenso.

His adversaries, though unable to remove him from his episcopal office, succeeded in restricting his ability to preach both in Natal and in England. Bishop Gray not only excommunicated him but consecrated a rival bishop (William Macrorie), who took the title of "Bishop of Maritzburg" (the latter a common name for Pietermaritzburg). The contributions of the missionary societies were withdrawn, but an attempt to deprive him of his episcopal income and the control of St Peter's Cathedral in Pietermaritzburg was frustrated by another court ruling. Colenso, encouraged by a handsome testimonial raised in England to which many clergymen had subscribed, returned to his diocese. A rival cathedral was built but it has long since been sold and moved. The new Cathedral of the Nativity, beside St Peter's, honours both Bishop Colenso and Bishop Macrorie in the names it has given to its halls.

Songs were written by Samuel John Stone as a response to the schism within the Church of South Africa. It inspired him to write a set of hymns titled Lyra Fidelium; Twelve Hymns on the Twelve Articles of the Apostles' Creed (1866). Among them was "The Church's One Foundation".

=== Advocacy of native African causes ===
Colenso devoted the latter years of his life to further labours as a biblical commentator and as an advocate for native Africans in Natal and Zululand who had been unjustly treated by the colonial regime in Natal. In 1874 he took up the cause of Langalibalele and the Hlubi and Ngwe tribes in representations to the Colonial Secretary, Lord Carnarvon. Langalibalele had been falsely accused of rebellion in 1873 and, following a charade of a trial, was found guilty and imprisoned on Robben Island. In taking the side of Langalibalele against the Colonial regime in Natal and Theophilus Shepstone, the Secretary for Native Affairs, Colenso found himself even further estranged from colonial society in Natal.

Colenso's concern about the misleading information that was being provided to the Colonial Secretary in London by Shepstone and the Governor of Natal prompted him to devote much of the final part of his life to championing the cause of the Zulus against Boer oppression and official encroachments. He was a prominent critic of Sir Bartle Frere's efforts to depict the Zulu kingdom as a threat to Natal. Following the conclusion of the Anglo-Zulu War he interceded on behalf of Cetshwayo with the British government and succeeded in getting him released from Robben Island and returned to Zululand.

He was known as 'Sobantu' (father of the people) to the native Africans in Natal and had a close relationship with members of the Zulu royal family; one of whom, Mkhungo (a son of Mpande), was taught at his school in Bishopstowe. After his death his wife and daughters continued his work supporting the Zulu cause and the organisation that eventually became the African National Congress.

=== Polygenism ===
Colenso was a polygenist; he believed in Co-Adamism—that is, that races had been created separately. Colenso pointed to monuments and artefacts in Egypt to debunk monogenist beliefs that all races came from the same stock, (that is, from Adam and Eve). Ancient Egyptian representations of races, for example, showed exactly how the races looked today. Egyptological evidence indicated the existence of remarkable permanent differences in the shape of the skull, bodily form, colour and physiognomy between different races. Colenso believed that racial variation between races was so great, that it was impossible that all the races could have come from the same stock just a few thousand years ago. He was unconvinced that the climate could change racial variation. With other biblical polygenists, Colenso believed that monogenists had interpreted the Bible incorrectly. Colenso said "It seems most probable that the human race, as it now exists, had really sprung from more than one pair." Colenso denied that polygenism caused any kind of racist attitudes or practices; like many other polygenists, he claimed that monogenesis was the cause of slavery and racism. Colenso claimed that each race had sprung from a different pair of parents, and that all races had been created as equals by God.

== Death ==
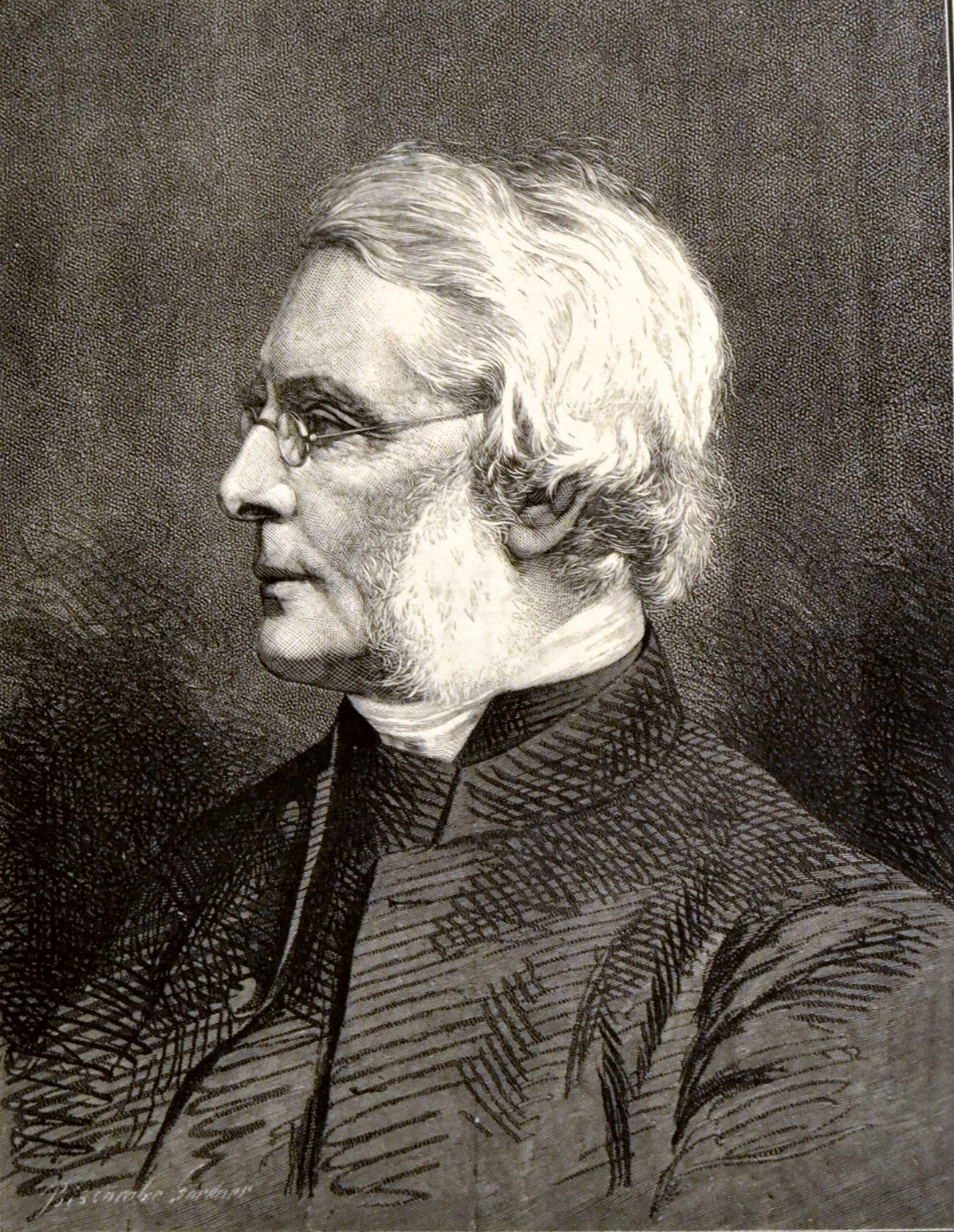
Portrait by William Biscombe Gardner

Colenso died at Durban, South Africa, on 20 June 1883, and was buried in front of the altar in his church, St Peter's, Pietermaritzburg. His daughter Frances Colenso (1849–1887) published two books on the relations of the Zulus to the British (History of the Zulu War and Its Origin in 1880 and The Ruin of Zululand in 1885) that explained recent events in Zululand from a pro-Zulu perspective. His oldest daughter, Harriette Colenso (1847 – 1932), took up Colenso's mantle as advocate for the Zulus in opposition to their treatment by the authorities appointed by Natal, especially in the case of Dinizulu in 1888–1889 and in 1908–1909.

== Personal life ==
Colenso married Sarah Frances Bunyon in 1846, and they had five children, Harriette Emily, Frances Ellen, Robert John, Francis "Frank" Ernest, and Agnes. (In the marriage register, her name is spelt Bunyan. There had long been variations in the spelling of a surname that goes back at least to the 12th century in England and in Normandy. That story is told in the still standard biography, John Bunyan 1628-1688 : His Life, Times, and Work, by John Brown.) Sarah's sister Harriette McDougall was a missionary.

== In popular culture ==
- In the 1979 film Zulu Dawn, Colenso is sympathetically portrayed by Freddie Jones, as a principled critic of the decision to declare war on Cetshwayo and the Zulus.
- A minor town Colenso in the province of KwaZulu-Natal, South Africa, is named after him.
- The Zulu people of his era nicknamed him "Sobantu", a name that translates to 'father of the people'. The township Sobantu in the city of Pietermaritzburg is named after him.

== Published works ==
- Remarks on the Proper Treatment of Cases of Polygamy Converts from Heathensm. May & Davis. 1855a.
- Ten weeks in Natal: A journal of a first tour of visitation among the colonists and Zulu Kafirs of Natal. Macmillan & co. 1855b.
- First Steps of the Zulu Mission (October 1859). Society for the Propagation of the Gospel in Foreign Parts. 1860.
- Zulu-English dictionary. Davis. 1861.
- The Pentateuch and Book of Joshua Critically Examined: Part I: The Pentateuch Examined as an Historical Narrative. Longman, Green, Longman, Roberts & Green. 1862.
- St. Paul's Epistle to the Romans. D. Appleton & Company. 1863.
- The Pentateuch and Book of Joshua Critically Examined (PDF). Longman, Green, Longman, Roberts, & Green. 1865.
  Part I: The Pentateuch Examined as an Historical Narrative (pp. 1–72).
  Part II: The Age and Authorship of the Pentateuch Considered (pp. 73–160).
  Part III: The Book of Deuteronomy (pp. 161–272).
  Part IV: The First Eleven Chapters of Genesis (pp. 273–356).
  Part V: The First Eleven Chapters of Genesis (continued) (pp. 357–428).
- Natal sermons. 1866. (The 1st and 2nd series of the Natal Sermons have been re-printed, but the 3rd and 4th series, published only in South Africa and extremely rare, have not yet been reprinted.)
- Arithmetic. Designed for Use in Schools (revised ed.). London: Longman, Green, and Co. 1886.
- The Pentateuch and Book of Joshua Critically Examined: Part VI: The Later Legislation of the Pentateuch, London: Longmans, Green, and Co. 1871.
- Lectures on the Pentateuch and the Moabite Stone. Longmans, Green. 1873. p. 2.
- The Pentateuch and Book of Joshua Critically Examined by the Right Rev. John William Colenso, D.D., Bishop of Natal: Part VII: The Pentateuch and Book of Joshua compared with the other Hebrew Scriptures, Longmans, Green, and Co. 1879.
- First Steps in Zulu: Being an Elementary Grammar of the Zulu Language. P. Davis & Sons. 1890. p. 1.
- Three Native Accounts of the Visit of the Bishop of Natal in September and October, 1859, to Umpande, King of the Zulus. Vause, Slatter. 1901.
- Draper, Jonathan A., ed. (2003). Commentary on Romans. Cluster Publications. ISBN 978-1-875053-30-8.

Anglican Church of Southern Africa titles
New diocese	Bishop of Natal; 1853–1883	Succeeded by Hamilton Baynes
