= Caro Feely =

Caro Feely (born Caroline Marian Wardle 6 October 1968) is a South African-born Irish writer, Wine & Spirit Education Trust certified wine educator, winemaker, yoga teacher and organic activist living in Saussignac, France.

== Early life and education ==
Caro grew up in a sugar farming area in Kwa-Zulu Natal in South Africa. After high school at St. Anne's Diocesan College boarding school in Hilton, South Africa she completed a BCom at the University of KwaZulu Natal then Honours at the University of South Africa and a Masters in Economics at Rand Afrikaans University.

== Career ==
She met her husband Sean Feely, a journalist at the time, in Johannesburg. They lived and worked in Dublin for eight years before moving to France to set up an organic vineyard in 2005.. Her first book Grape Expectations is about moving from Dublin city to France to go wine farming and converting to organic.

The second book Saving Our Skins is about settling, converting to biodynamics, transforming the farm to an organic vineyard.

In 2015 Summersdale published a wine book by Feely, Wine: The Essential Guide to Tasting, History, Culture and More.

In 2017 Summersdale published Feely's third book in the series about life on the organic vineyard: 'Glass Half Full'

In 2023 Feely negotiated the return of the rights to her memoirs published by Summersdale and started a new path as an independent author. In April 2023 she has published new editions of Grape Expectations and Saving our Skins and edited, renamed and republished Glass Half Full as Vineyard Confessions. In June 2023 she published the fourth book in the vineyard series Cultivating Change - Regenerating Land and Love in the Age of Climate Crisis'. On 5 December 2023 she published a prequel to the series Saving Sophia, a medical drama set in Dublin.

The vineyard owned and run with husband Sean, Chateau Feely, won the Best of Wine Tourism gold trophy for sustainable tourism in the Bordeaux region in 2013 under the original farm name 'Haut Garrigue', officially changed to the Family name SARL Chateau Feely on 20 June 2014 and for vineyard accommodation in 2017. Feely is the wine writer for Living magazine and has articles published on JancisRobinson

Feely is a regular speaker on the subject of organic farming and wine.

The Feelys continue to produce a number of organic, biodynamic and natural wines recognised for their quality and cited as a favourite by a famous character of the Dordogne Martin Walker's 'Bruno Chief of Police'. The Feely vineyard is also known for their vineyard share and harvest weekend covered on RTE (Irish National Broadcaster) Nationwide in November 2009.

== Bibliography ==
- Grape Expectations Publisher: Summersdale (4 Jun 2012) Rights returned and new Edition by Caro Feely in 2023. Language: English. Current E-book ISBN 978-2-9586304-1-6 Current Print Book ISBN 978-2-9586304-0-9 Prior edition out of print ISBN 1849532575 ISBN 978-1849532570 (also translated into Polish)
- Saving Our Skins Publisher: Summersdale (7 Jul 2014) Rights returned and new Edition by Caro Feely in 2023. Language: English. Current E-book ISBN 978-2-9586304-3-0 Current Print Book ISBN 978-2-9586304-2-3 Prior edition out of print Language: English ISBN 978-1849536097
- Wine: The Essential Guide to Tasting, History, Culture and More. Summersdale, 2015 ISBN 978-1-78372-683-7.
- Glass Half Full (Publisher: Summersdale (13 April 2017) Language: English ISBN 184953991X ISBN 978-1849539913 Rights returned February 2023, book edited, renamed and republished 17 April 2023 as Vineyard Confessions English. Current E-book ISBN 978-2-9586304-5-4 Current Print Book ISBN 978-2-9586304-4-7
- Cultivating Change Publisher: Caro Feely (2 June 2023) Language: English E-book ISBN 978-2-9586304-7-8 Print book ISBN 978-2-9586304-6-1.
- Saving Sophia Publisher Caro Feely (5 December 2023) Language: English E-book ISBN 978-2-9586304-9-2 Print book ISBN 978-2-9586304-8-5
