= William Macrorie =

Bishop of Maritzburg

The Right Reverend William Macrorie D.D., D.C.L.
- Bishop of Maritzburg
- Church: Anglican
- Province: Southern Africa
- Diocese: Maritzburg
- Appointed: 1868
- Term ended: 1892
- Successor: Hamilton Baynes

Orders
- Consecration: 25 January 1869 by Robert Gray

Personal details
- Born: 8 February 1831 Liverpool
- Died: 24 September 1905 (aged 74)

The Rt Revd William Kenneth Macrorie (1831–1905) was bishop of Maritzburg, while John Colenso was bishop of the Diocese of Natal.

Macrorie was born at Liverpool on 8 February 1831, was eldest son of David Macrorie, a Liverpool physician, by his wife Sarah, daughter of John Barber. Admitted to Winchester College in 1844, he matriculated at Brasenose College, Oxford, on 2 February 1849. He graduated B.A. in 1852, and was elected to a senior Hulme exhibition at his college in 1854. On proceeding M.A. in 1855 he became a fellow or assistant-master at St Peter's (Radley College). Made deacon in the same year and ordained priest in 1857, he was successively curate of Deane (1858–60), and then the first vicar of Wingates, Lancashire (1860-1). In 1861 Archibald Tait, Bishop of London, presented him to the rectory of Wapping, and in 1865 Hulme's trustees nominated him to the perpetual curacy of Accrington.

In January 1868 Robert Gray (bishop of Cape Town), offered Macrorie the bishopric of the church in Natal. John Colenso was still in Natal, having declined to recognise his canonical deposition from the see, which had been pronounced in 1863. Since that date Bishop Gray had made unsuccessful efforts to establish, in the colony, a new rival episcopate. After some hesitation Macrorie accepted the post, being the first colonial bishop not appointed by the Crown. Since Colenso enjoyed a legal right to the title of bishop of Natal, Macrorie was designated bishop of Maritzburg. The government of Lord Derby disapproved the appointment and refused to grant the Queen's mandate for Macrorie's consecration in any place where the Act of Uniformity was in force. Archbishop of Canterbury Charles Longley vetoed the ceremony in the province of Canterbury, and the Scottish bishops declined to take any part in the rite. Eventually Bishop Gray himself consecrated Macrorie at Cape Town on 25 January 1869, regardless of a protest signed by 129 adherents of Colenso.

Macrorie's uncompromising high churchmanship tended to prolong the schism in the Natal church. He showed zeal and energy in the performance of his duties, and owed much influence to the financial support of the Society Partners in the Gospel and the Society for Promoting Christian Knowledge, which had been withdrawn from Colenso. But his want of tact alienated moderate opinion, and his fierce denunciations of Colenso's supporters widened the prevailing breach. Archbishop Edward White Benson sought in vain to reconcile the contending parties. At length in June 1883, on the death of Colenso, Benson suggested to Macrorie the propriety either of resigning or of accepting the see of Bloemfontein. But Macrorie declined to entertain the 'cowardly thought.' Macrorie's difficulties diminished on the refusal of the archbishop to consecrate either George William Cox or William Ayerst whom the Colenso party, on their leader's death, elected to the bishopric of Natal. At length Macrorie resigned his see in 1891, and being appointed next year to a canonry in Ely Cathedral, served the diocese as assistant-bishop. He died at the College, Ely, on 24 September 1905, and was buried in the cathedral close. On 9 April 1863 he married Agnes, youngest daughter of William Watson of South Hill, Liverpool. In 1876 he was created honorary D.D. of Oxford and D.C.L. of the University of South Africa.

One of his grandchildren was Clemence Margaret Acland, a nature photographer, ornithologist and researcher.

== See also ==
- Project Canterbury

== Notes and references ==
- Woods, G. S. (2004). "Macrorie, William Kenneth (1831–1905)". In Milne, Lynn (ed.). Oxford Dictionary of National Biography (online ed.). Oxford University Press. doi:10.1093/ref:odnb/34823. (Subscription, Wikipedia Library access or UK public library membership required.)
- Woods, Gabriel Stanley (1912). "Macrorie, William Kenneth" . In Lee, Sidney (ed.). Dictionary of National Biography (2nd supplement). Vol. 2. London: Smith, Elder & Co.
- "Death Of Bishop Macrorie. The Bishopric Of Maritzburg: A Dismal Story". Cambridge Independent Press. 29 September 1905 – via British Newspaper Archive.
- "Death Bishop Macrorie". Derby Daily Telegraph. 25 September 1905 – via British Newspaper Archive.
- "The Bishop Of Maritzburg's Farewell". Morning Post. 7 December 1868 – via British Newspaper Archive.

Anglican Church of Southern Africa titles
New title	Bishop of Maritzburg; 1868 - 1892	Succeeded by Hamilton Baynes
