= Hilton, KwaZulu-Natal =

Hilton
- Location within KwaZulu-Natal Location within South Africa Location within Africa
- Coordinates: 29°33′S 30°18′E
- Country: South Africa
- Province: KwaZulu-Natal
- District: UMgungundlovu
- Municipality: uMngeni

Area
  - Total: 30.90 km^{2} (11.93 sq mi)
- Elevation: 1,080 m (3,540 ft)

Population (2011)
  - Total: 9,340
  - Density: 302/km^{2} (783/sq mi)

Racial makeup (2011)
  - Black African: 27.4%
  - Coloured: 1.9%
  - Indian/Asian: 2.5%
  - White: 67.6%
  - Other: 0.7%

First languages (2011)
  - English: 72.1%
  - Zulu: 17.0%
  - Afrikaans: 7.3%
  - Other: 3.6%
- Time zone: UTC+2 (SAST)
- Postal code (street): 3245
- PO box: 3245
- Area code: 033

Hilton is a small town that lies between Howick and Pietemaritzburg in the province of KwaZulu-Natal, South Africa. In 1872 the Reverend William Orde Newnham opened Hilton College on a large estate 7.8km north of the town, which is now one of South Africa's leading private schools.

Hilton forms the easternmost part of the uMngeni Local Municipality which falls under the uMgungudlovu District Municipality, governing the Midlands of KwaZulu-Natal.

== History ==
The woman who named Hilton was Jane Henderson, her husband being Joseph Henderson (1825–1899), merchant, banker, financier and politician. He married Jane Maidstone née Pearson on the 13th Aug 1849 in Pietermaritzburg and accompanied Theophilus Shepstone as adviser to the Transvaal in 1877.

Education in Hilton includes Cowan House, a private mixed boarding school for over 300 pupils. The school, founded in 1948 was destroyed in a fire in 1997 and was rebuilt the same year. Also, there is St. Anne's Diocesan College, Grace College and Laddsworth Primary School.

== Geography ==
Hilton lies 1,080 m (3,540 ft) on the brow of the escarpment above Pietermaritzburg, located halfway between the city centre of Pietermaritzburg (9 km southeast) and Howick (11 km northwest). The town is primarily built south of the N3 highway while the small suburb of Hilton Gardens suburb lies north of the N3. It is bounded by Garlington Estate to the north, and Cedara to the north-west, and Pietermaritzburg and Chase Valley to the south-east

=== Suburban areas ===
For census purposes (2011), the main place of Hilton includes the following sub-places:

- Berry Hill
- Hiltara Park
  - A portmanteau of Hilton and Cedara
- Hilton Village (Hilton proper)
- Hilton Gardens
- Leonard
- Mountain Homes
- Mount Michael
- Sweetwaters
- Winterskloof
- World's View.

== Transport ==
=== Roads ===
Hilton is bypassed by the major N3 highway to the north, routing traffic heading north-west from Pietermaritzburg towards Harrismith. Hilton is mainly connected to the N3 by Hilton Avenue or alternatively the R103 from Cedara.

The main north–south route through Hilton is the M80 (Hilton Avenue; Dennis Shepstone Drive) connecting Hilton College with Pietermaritzburg. The main east–west route through Hilton is the R103 (Cedara Road; Old Howick Road) connecting Howick with Pietermaritzburg.
