= Julia Bolton Holloway =

European literary scholar

- Born: 14 April 1937 (age 89); Marylebone, London, England
- Occupations: Academic, literary critic

Academic background
- Education: San Jose State University; University of California, Berkeley
- Thesis: The Figure of the Pilgrim in Medieval Poetry (1974)
- Doctoral advisor: Phillip W. Damon

Academic work
- Sub-discipline: Medieval literature; Victorian literature
- Institutions: Princeton University; University of Colorado Boulder; Southern Methodist University

Julia Bolton Holloway (born 14 April 1937) is a European literary scholar. She is Professor Emerita of Medieval Studies at the University of Colorado Boulder.

== Early life and education ==
Holloway was born on 14 April 1937 in Marylebone, London, and later lived on the pilgrimage road to Canterbury in Sussex. Her parents were the writer John Robert Glorney Bolton and Sybil Margaret Rutherford. She is also the great granddaughter of Sir James Roberts.

She attended San Jose State University for her B.A. degree in English (1957) and the University of California Berkeley for her M.A. (1967) and her Ph.D. (1974) in English. Her doctoral thesis, titled "The Figure of the Pilgrim in Medieval Poetry," was later published as the book The Pilgrim and the Book: A Study of Dante, Langland, and Chaucer.

== Academic career ==
Holloway worked as a Teaching Assistant at the University of California, Berkeley from 1967–71; then, while writing the dissertation, Holloway taught at Quincy University (Illinois) from 1971-74. After graduating, she worked as an Assistant Professor of English at Princeton University from 1974-1981, where she was among the first generation of women to teach at the university. She then taught in the Humanities and Comparative Literature departments at the University of Colorado Boulder from 1981–92, chairing the Graduate Committee on Medieval Studies before becoming Associate Professor and Director of Medieval Studies, in 1987, and Professor Emerita, in 1992. She also taught as a Visiting Professor of English at Southern Methodist University.

Holloway's research is focused on the literature of the Middle Ages as well as Victorian literature, including the works of Dante, Dante's teacher Brunetto Latini, Elizabeth Barrett Browning, and women contemplatives such as, for example, Julian of Norwich and Birgitta of Sweden. One recent discovery involved unearthing a previously unknown Dante manuscript.

Her scholarship has been shaped by Phillip Damon, Charles Jones, Brendan O’Hehir, Sir Richard Southern, Victor Turner, Clifford Geertz, Julian Jaynes, John V. Fleming, Robert Hollander, William S. Heckscher, and Edward P. Nolan.

== Personal life ==
Having made the pilgrimages she had studied to Canterbury, Compostela, Rome, Jerusalem, and Sinai, she retired early from her university career and returned to England, where she entered the Anglican convent of the Community of the Holy Family at Holmhurst St Mary, becoming a novice in 1992 and serving as active librarian from 1993-96.

Upon closure of the Order, Holloway left England and became custodian, restorer, researcher, and librarian of the English Cemetery in Florence, which came into her care because she had edited the Penguin Classics edition of Aurora Leigh and Other Poems by Elizabeth Barrett Browning, who is buried there. While living here as a hermit nun for over a quarter of a century, she has taught literacy and restoration skills to the local Roma workers who assist her in tending the property.

== Selected works ==
- Holloway, Julia Bolton (1987). The Pilgrim and the Book: A Study of Dante, Langland, and Chaucer. New York: Peter Lang. ISBN 0-8204-0345-8.
- Holloway, Julia Bolton; Wright, Constance S.; Bechtold, Joan, eds. (1990). Equally in God's Image: Women in the Middle Ages. New York: P. Lang, Inc. ISBN 978-0820415178.
- Holloway, Julia Bolton (1993). Twice-Told Tales: Brunetto Latino and Dante Alighieri. New York: Peter Lang, Inc. ISBN 978-0820419541.
- Browning, Elizabeth Barrett (1996). Bolton, John Robert Glorney; Holloway, Julia Bolton (eds.). Aurora Leigh and Other Poems. New York: Penguin Classics. ISBN 978-0140434125.
- Julian of Norwich (2001). Reynolds, Sister Anna Maria; Holloway, Julia Bolton (eds.). Showing of Love: Extant Texts and Translation. Florence: SISMEL Edizioni del Galluzzo. ISBN 88-8450-095-8.
- Holloway, Julia Bolton (2016). Julian Among the Books: Julian of Norwich's Theological Library. Newcastle upon Tyne, UK: Cambridge Scholars Publishing. ISBN 978-1-4438-8894-3.
- Holloway, Julia Bolton (2024). Dante and His Circle: Education, Script, and Image. The New Middle Ages. Cham, Switzerland: Palgrave Macmillan. doi:10.1007/978-3-031-44093-9. ISBN 978-3031440939.
- Holloway, Julia Bolton (2024). Florence's English Cemetery, 1827–1877: Thunders of White Silence. Newcastle upon Tyne: Cambridge Scholars Publishing. ISBN 978-1-0364-1377-4.
