= Statue of Queen Anne, St Paul's Churchyard =

Statue in the City of London, England

Statue of Queen Anne
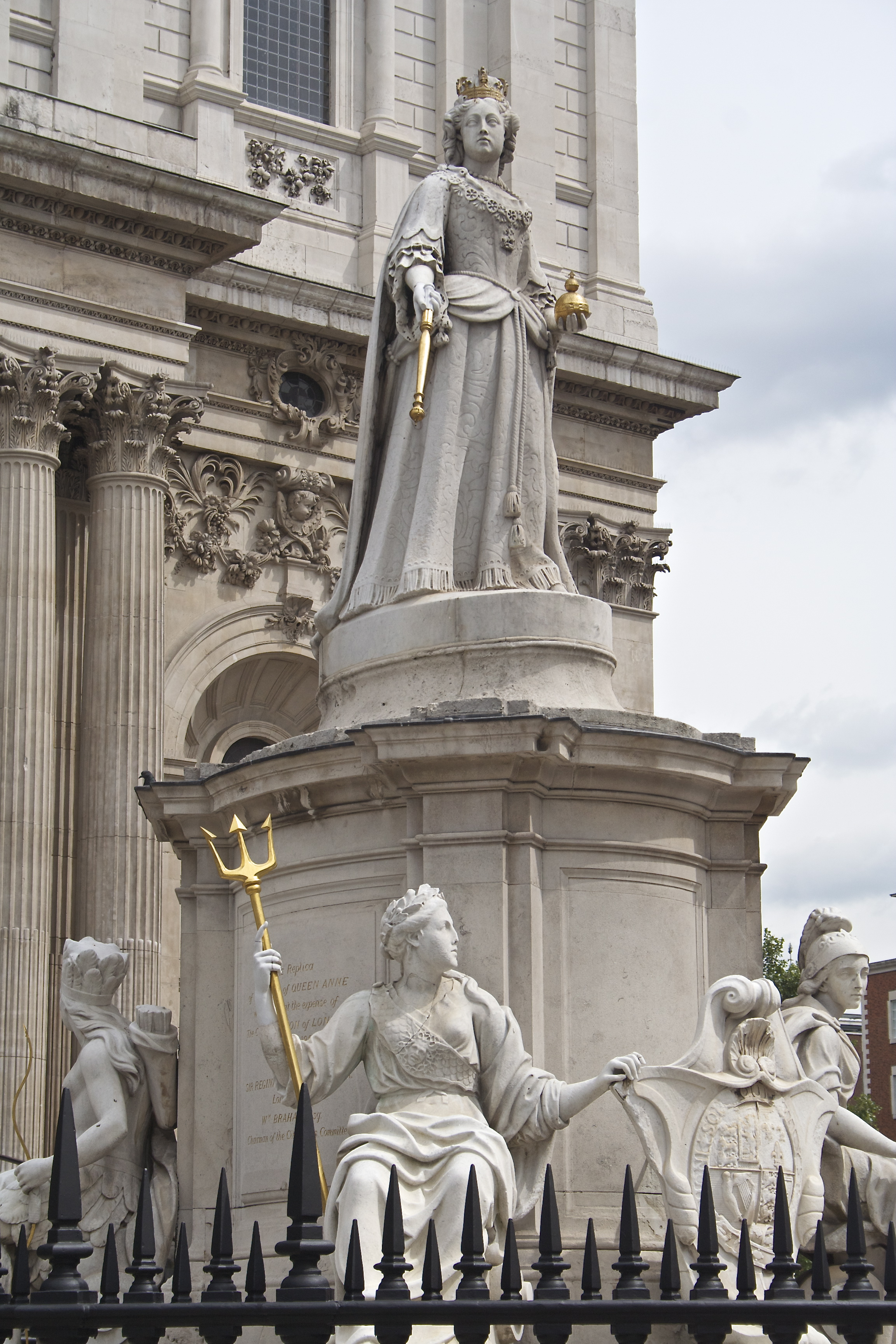
- The statue in 2011
- Artists: Richard Claude Belt and Louis-Auguste Malempré, after Francis Bird
- Year: 1886
- Medium: Marble
- Subject: Anne, Queen of Great Britain
- Location: London, United Kingdom; 51°30′49″N 0°06′00″W

Listed Building – Grade II
- Official name: Statue of Queen Anne in forecourt of St Paul's Cathedral
- Designated: 5 June 1972
- Reference no.: 1079158

A statue of Queen Anne is installed in the forecourt outside the west front of St Paul's Cathedral, in London, United Kingdom. It became a Grade II listed building in 1972.

== Description and history ==
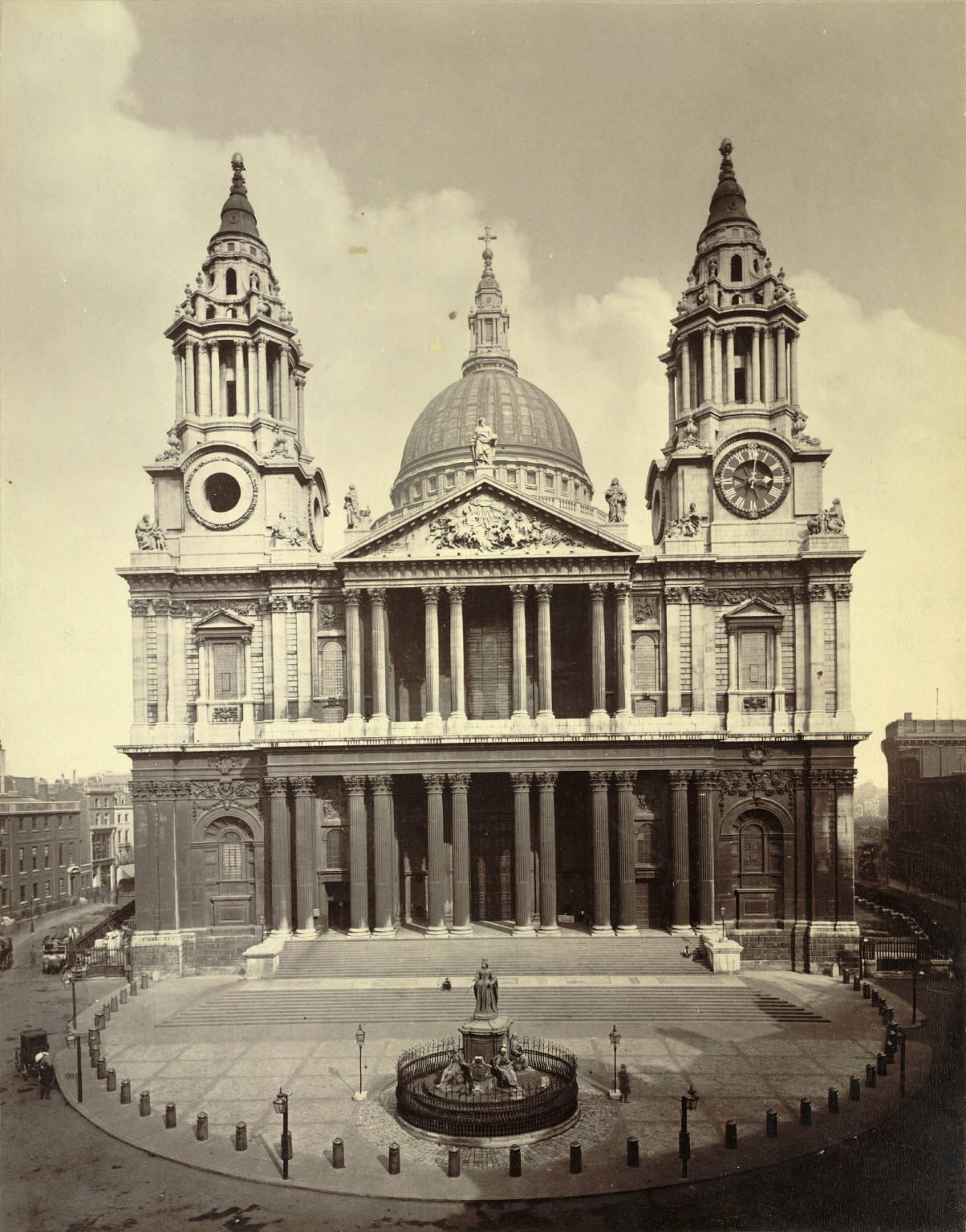
Photograph, c. 1865 – c. 1895, with the original railings by Jean Tijou still in place

The statue is a copy of a 1712 sculpture by Francis Bird in Carrara marble which formerly stood at the same location. Queen Anne was the ruling British monarch when the new St Paul's Cathedral was completed in 1710. Bird's statue was unveiled at a thanksgiving service for the Peace of Utrecht, held 7 July 1713. The statue cost £1,130, excluding the marble which was provided by the Queen. It was surrounded by an elegant metal railing made by Jean Tijou. The Tijou railings were later removed and replaced by heavier railings to match the others around the cathedral. The original statue was attacked at least three times, in 1743, 1768, and 1882, with noses and arms damaged, and it was also badly weathered by the 1880s. Reputedly, the statue was once defaced with the lines "Brandy Nan, Brandy Nan, left in the lurch; Her face to the gin-shop, her back to the church", alluding to the Queen's reputed fondness for strong liquor and the location of a gin palace near the cathedral.

Richard Claude Belt was commissioned in 1885 to create a replacement statue from Sicilian marble, supplied by the Corporation of London at a cost of £1,800. Belt was imprisoned for obtaining money by false pretences in March 1886, and Louis-Auguste Malempré completed the sculpture. The building work to install the statue was done by Mowlem and Sons, supervised by the city architect Sir Horace Jones, and the new sculpture was unveiled by Reginald Hanson, the Lord Mayor of London, on 15 December 1886, the year before the Golden Jubilee of Queen Victoria.

The stone carver Alex Wenham, restorer of the original statue, inspecting the replacement statue in front of St Paul's Cathedral

The Baroque sculpture depicts Queen Anne standing, facing down Ludgate Hill towards Ludgate Circus. She is robed, wearing the collar of the Order of the Garter and a gilded crown, with one hand holding a gilded orb and the other a gilded sceptre. The figure stands on a Portland stone pedestal by architect Christopher Wren, decorated with four symbolic figures, one on each corner: to the west, towards Ludgate Hill, are Britannia with gilded trident (representing England) and a figure representing France (with fleur-de-lys on the visor of her helmet), holding between them a carved representation of the British Royal Coat of Arms, and to the east, towards St Paul's Cathedral, are figures representing Ireland (with harp) and North America (a Native American, with feathered skirt and headdress, gilded bow, quiver of arrows, and lizard). The pedestal stands on three steps surrounded by heavy cast iron railings.

The pedestal bears two inscriptions: on the south side "The Original STATUE / was erected on this spot in the year 1712 / to commemorate the completion of / SAINT PAUL'S CATHEDRAL / FRANCIS BIRD Sculptor." and on the north side: "This Replica / of the Statue of QUEEN ANNE / was erected at the expense of / The CORPORATION of LONDON / In the year 1886 / The Rt. Hon. / SIR REGINALD HANSON M.A. F.S.A. / Lord Mayor / Wm. Braham Esq / Chairman of the City Lands Committee."

After they were removed, the original 8-ton weathered sculpture, and the four similarly weathered 5-ton stone figures from the base, were rediscovered months later, abandoned in the yard of a London stonemason. They were acquired by Augustus Hare and installed in the grounds of his house at Holmhurst St Mary near Hastings, with Queen Anne mounted on an elliptical pedestal and the four other seated figures on steps around at the base, similar to the original. The house was Grade II listed in 1976, and the statue received a separate Grade II* listing at the same time.

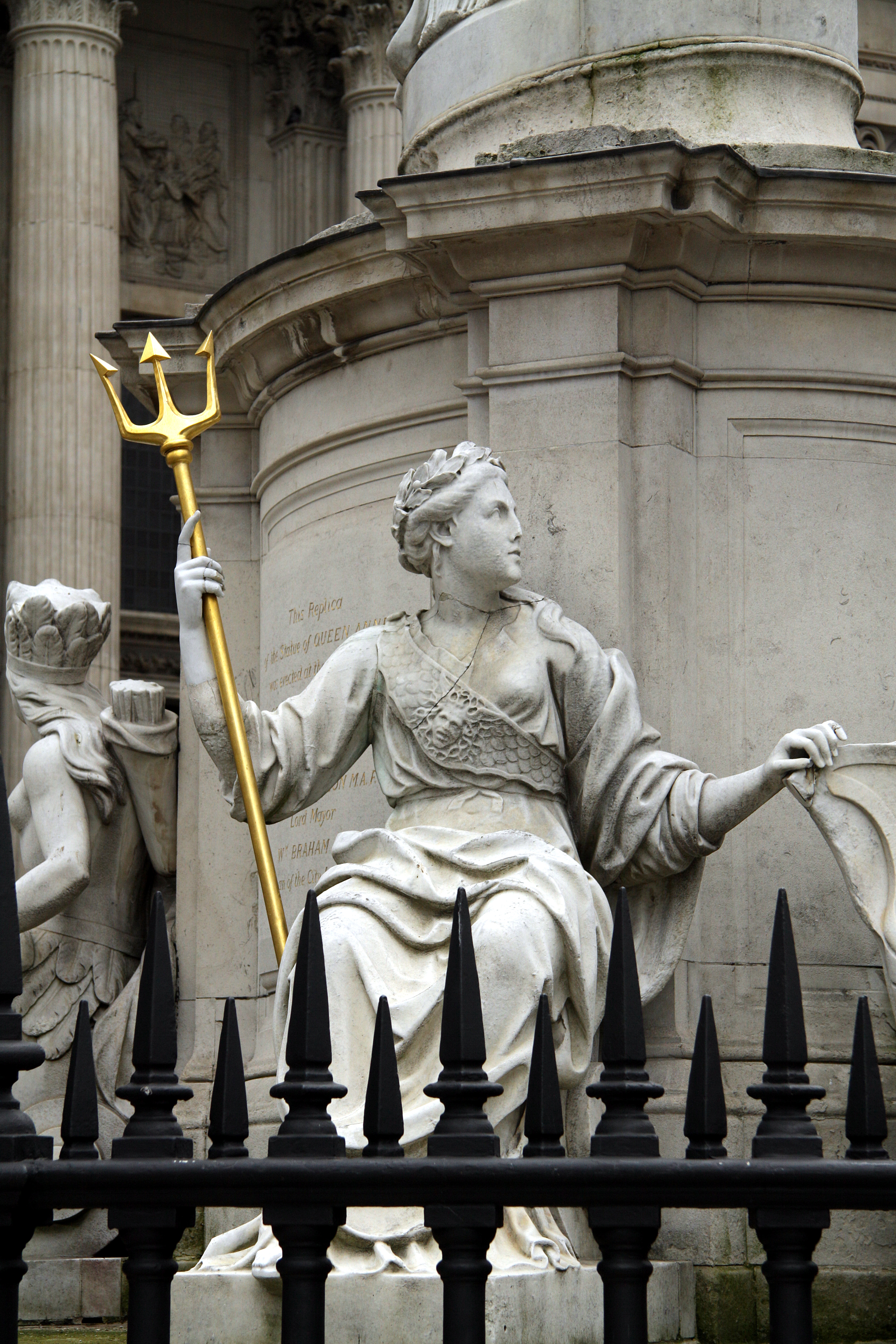
Britannia

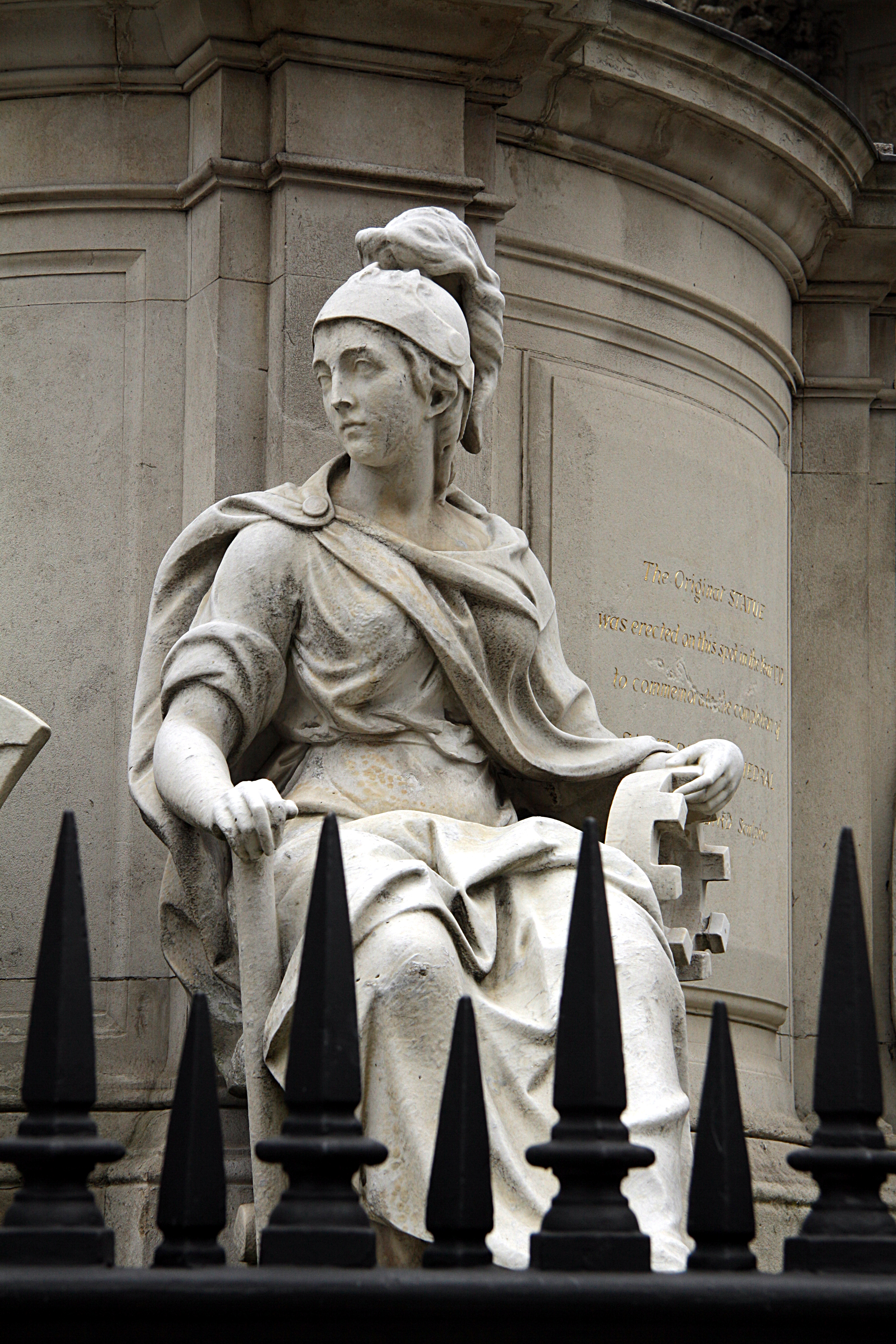
France

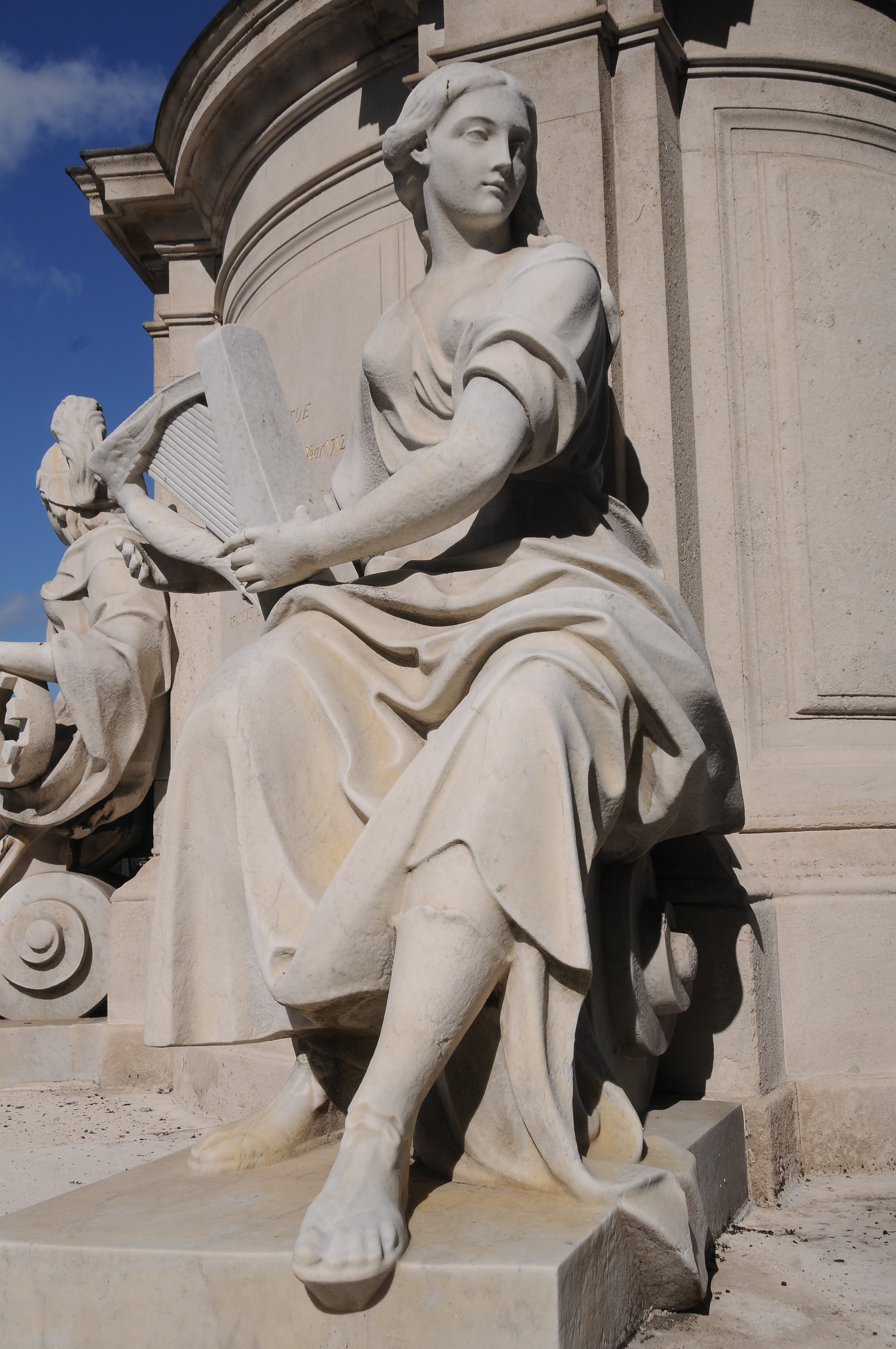
Ireland

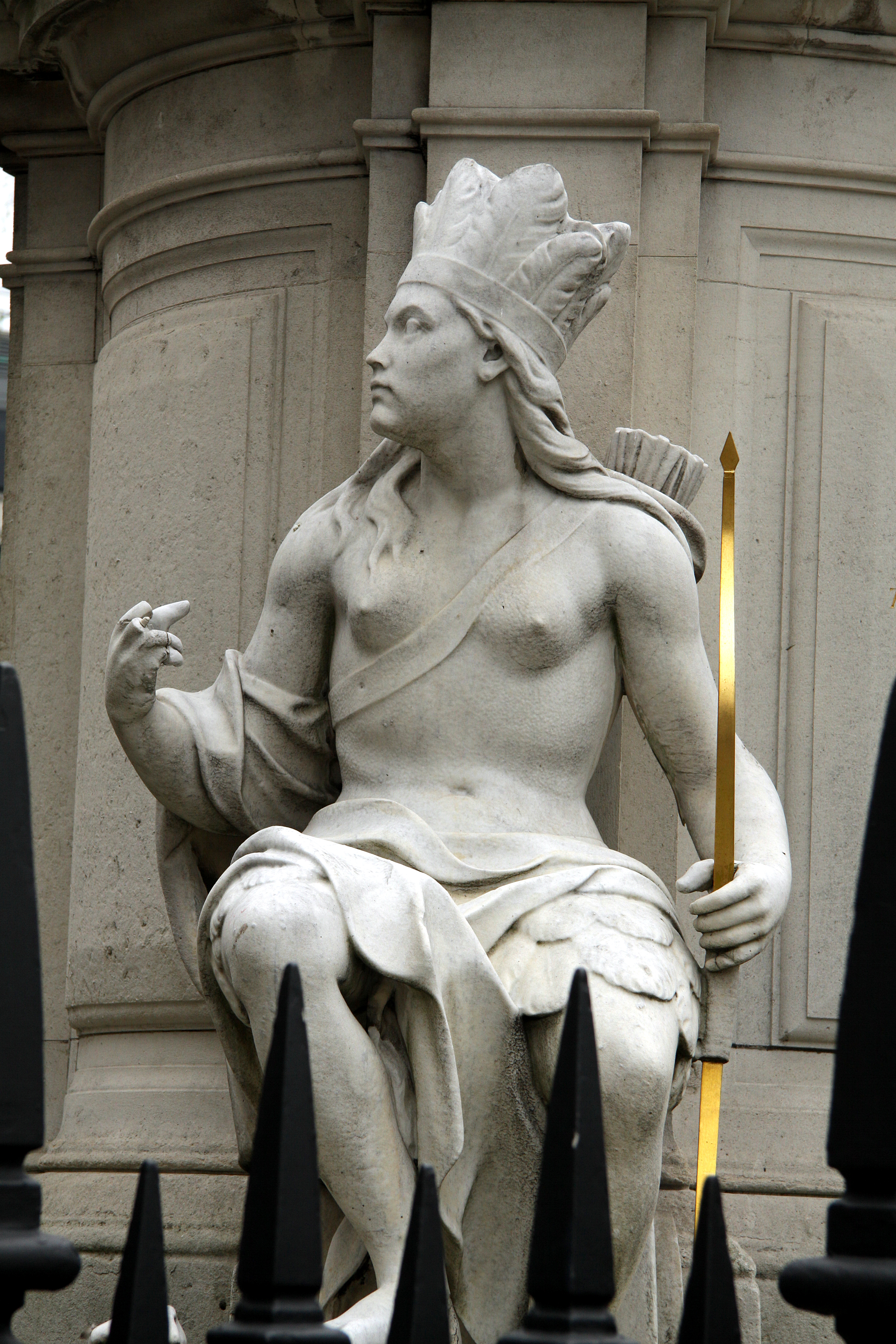
North America

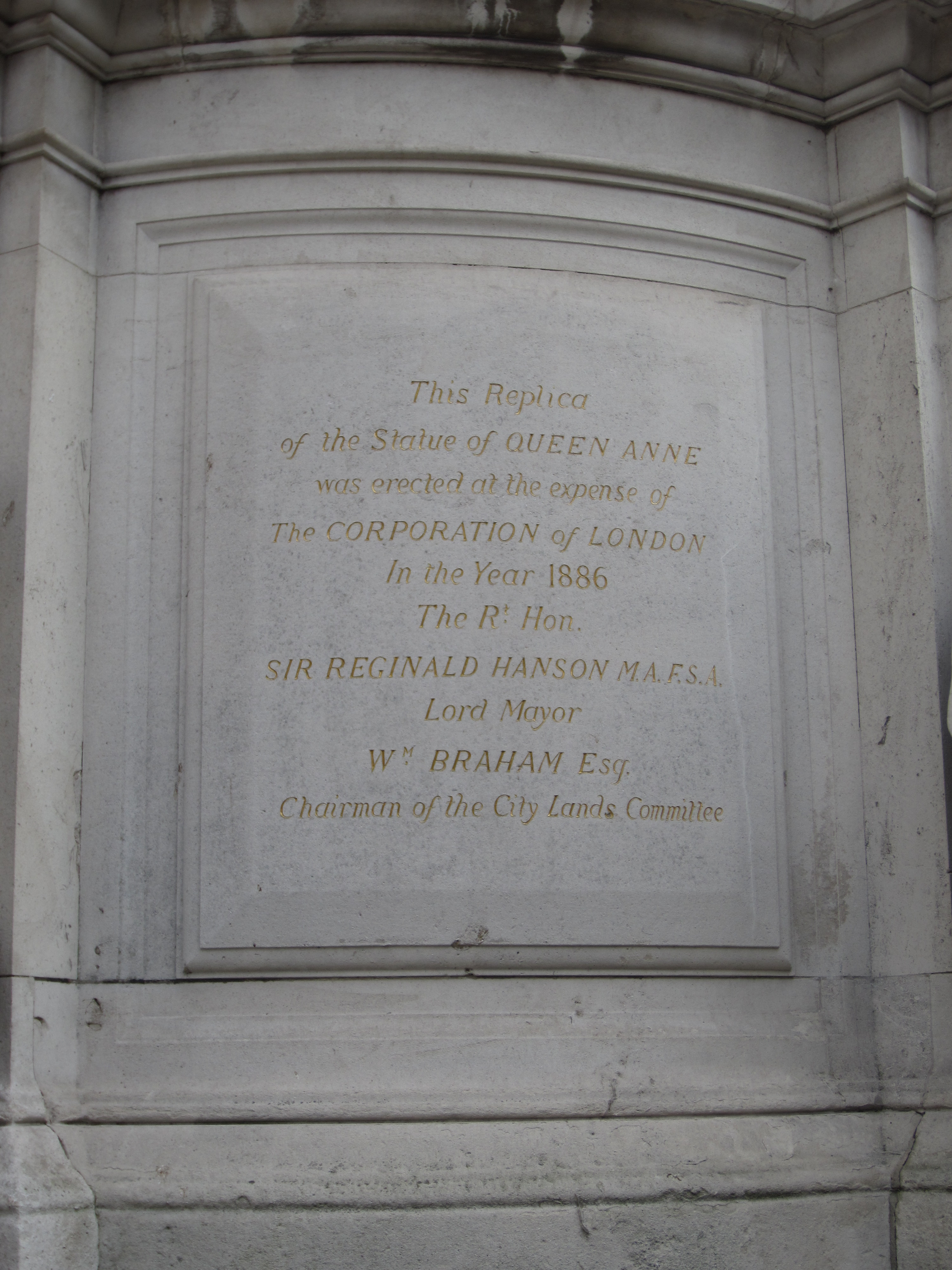
North inscription

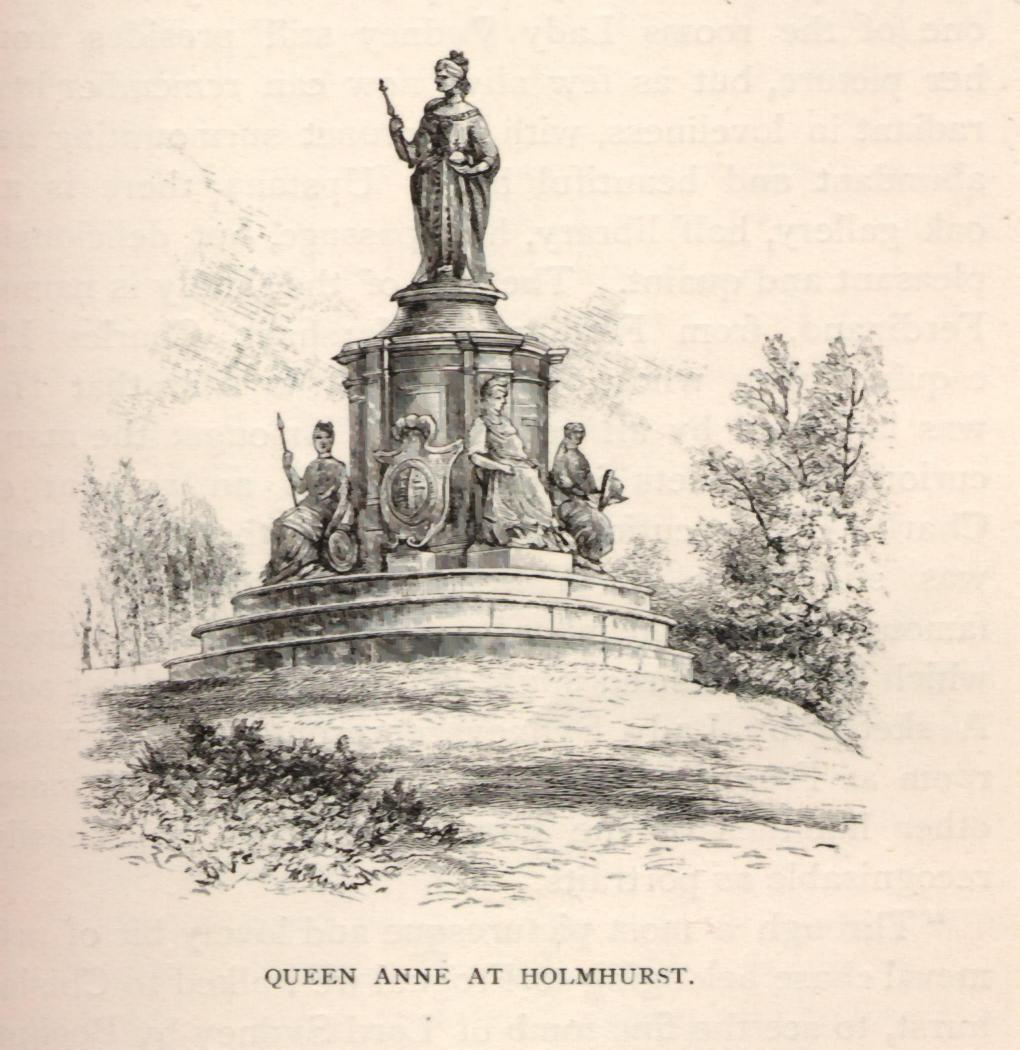
Drawing of the original statue at Holmhurst St Mary in 1885

== See also ==
- List of public art in the City of London
- List of statues of British royalty in London
