= Jeremiah Hill =

Jeremiah Hill may refer to:

- Jeremiah S. Hill, founder of the Arch Social Club
- Jeremiah Hill (basketball) (born 1995), American basketball player
- Jeremiah Hill (merchant) (died 1810), English merchant and landowner in Bristol
