= Holmhurst St Mary =

Building in Hastings, East Sussex, England

Coordinates: 50.887613°N 0.562087°E

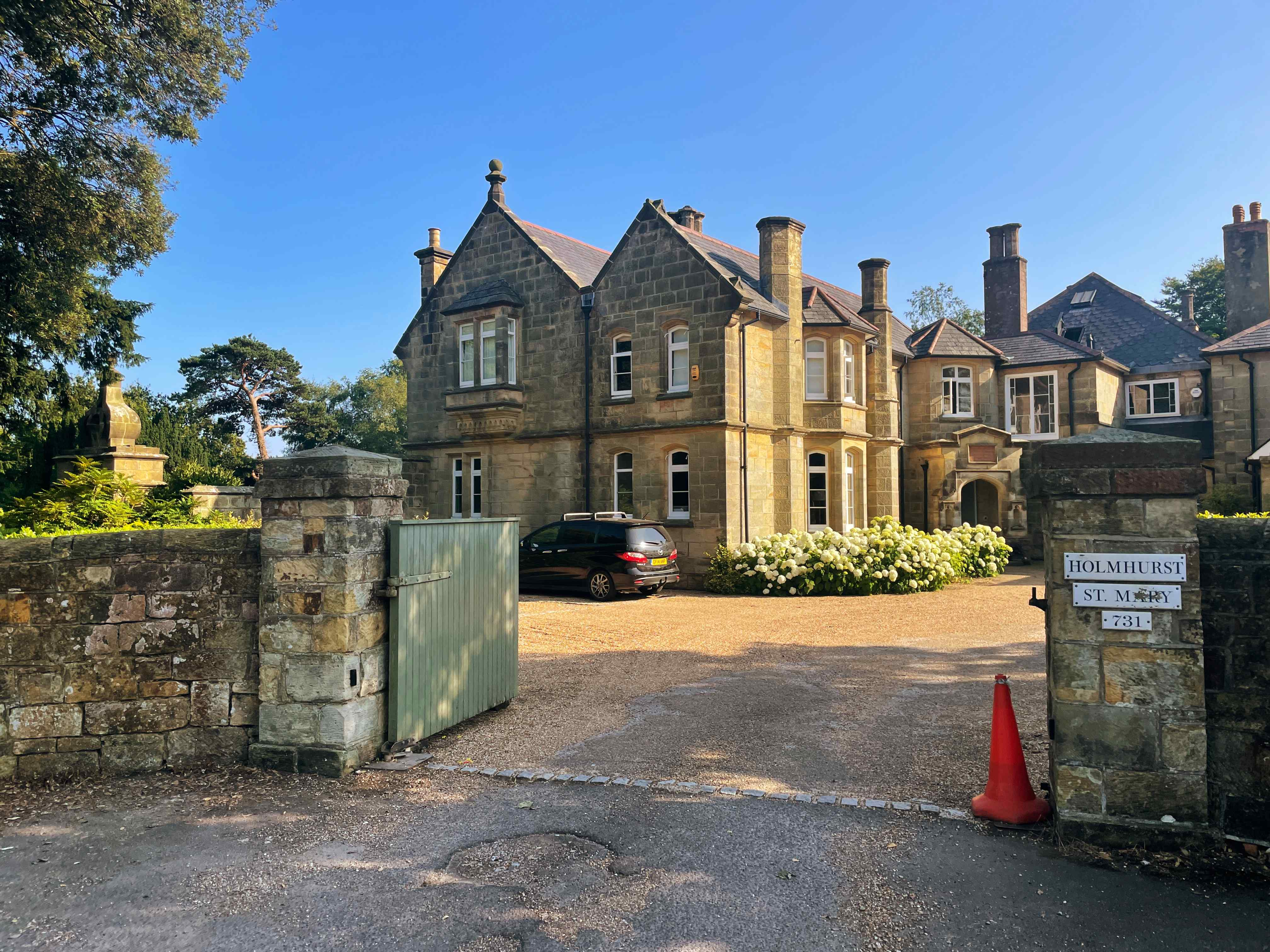
Holmhurst St Mary, 2021 photograph

Holmhurst St Mary is a historic house in Baldslow, East Sussex, England. The house is a Grade II listed building; a statue of Queen Anne in the grounds is Grade II* listed.

== Hare family ==
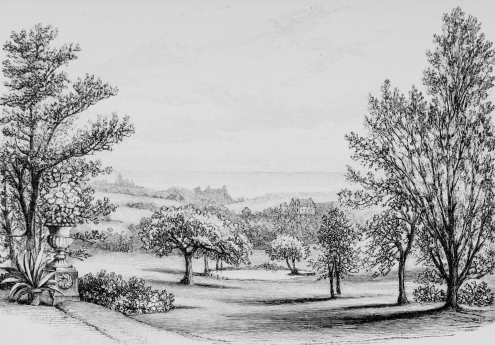
View from Holmhurst St Mary, by Augustus Hare

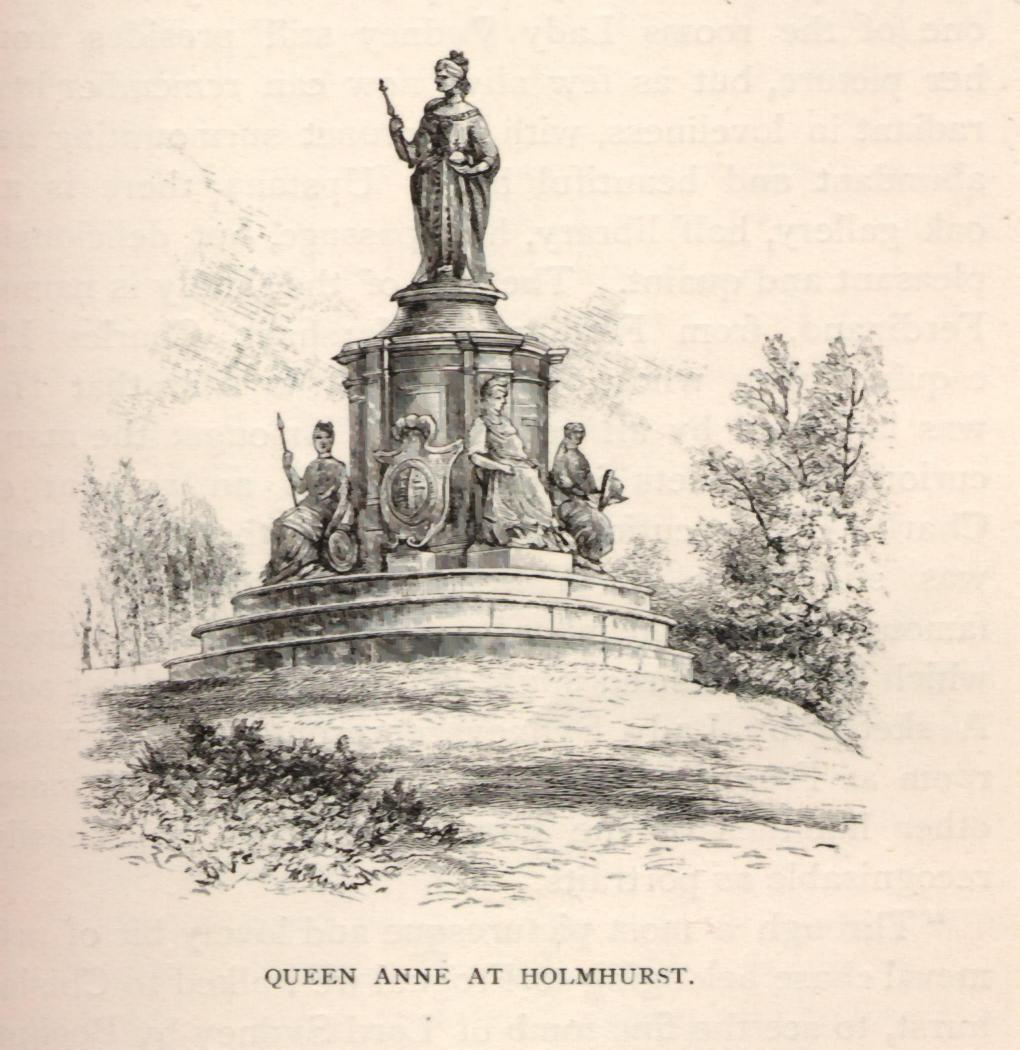
Statue of Queen Anne at Holmhurst

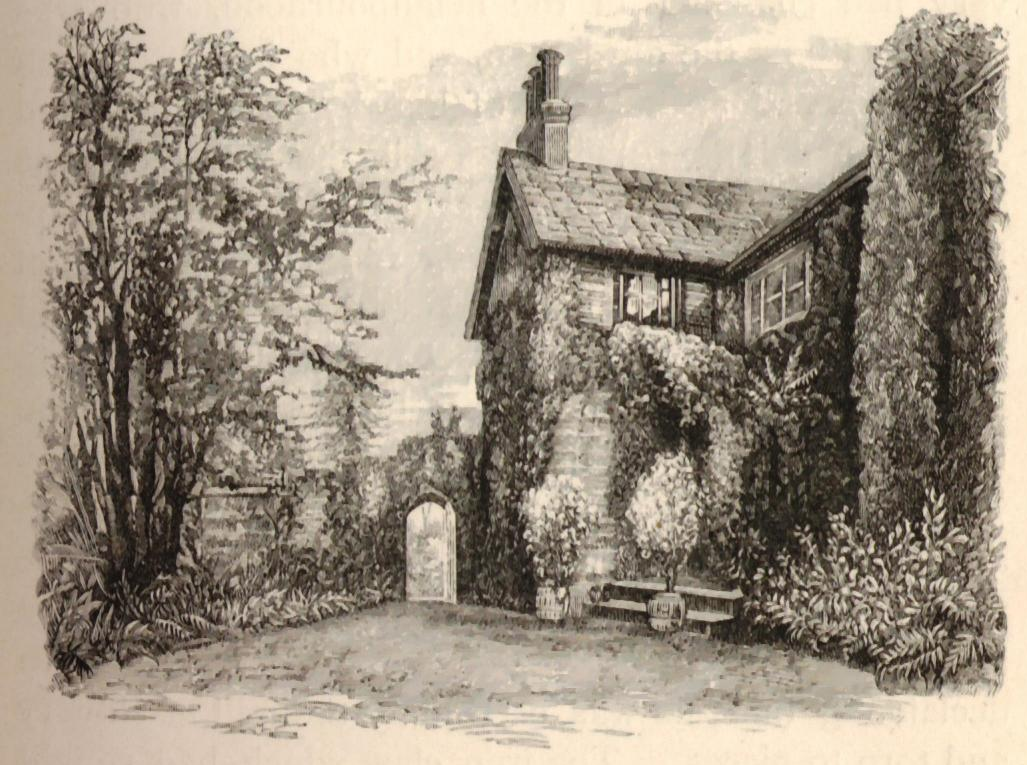
The Porch, Holmhurst St Mary, by Augustus Hare

In 1860 Maria Hare, adoptive mother of Augustus Hare, purchased the house, then named "Little Ridge", to which they moved from Herstmonceux. It was small, and could at that point be considered by Augustus Hare not much more than a "cottage". They renamed it as Holmhurst St Mary. It came with an estate of 36 acres (15 ha).

Holmhurst St Mary was then over the road (now the B2063) from the Hastings Cemetery. It was described in 1894 as being at Beaulieu, near Ore. An 1875 Ordnance Survey book for the parish of St Mary in the Castle mentions Holmhurst, Beaulieu and Little Ridge Farm. The area was considered an "outlying part" of the parish, this being the reason that a chapel of ease, the Iron Church, was erected on the other side of the road.

Augustus Hare described the house's location as "situated on the high narrow ridge of hill which divides the seaboard near Hastings from the richly-wooded undulations of the Weald". He spent heavily on the house and grounds, as well as his books and art collection there.

In his will Hare, who died in 1903, left the house to the family of Edward Penrhyn MP (died 1861, né Leycester), brother of Maria Hare, with use of Holmhurst St Mary for life to the daughter Emma Leycester Penrhyn.

=== Statue of Queen Anne ===
The statue of Queen Anne is a 1712 sculpture by Francis Bird in Carrara marble which stood outside St Paul's Cathedral. When it was badly weathered, it was removed in 1885, and replaced by a replica by Richard Belt in 1886. Bird's original statue was bought by Hare and brought to Holmhurst, with its four supporting pieces, representing England, Ireland, France and America.

=== Visitors to Holmhurst St Mary ===
At the end of Maria Hare's life, from summer 1870, she was visited often at Holmhurst by Elizabeth Grove (1792–1883) of Oakhurst, Hastings. Augustus Hare described her "primitive-looking hat and apron", with a basket on her arm. She was the daughter of Jeremiah Hill and the widowed second wife of Thomas Grove (1783–1845), who was owner of a large estate in Radnorshire, and the eldest brother of the diarists Charlotte Grove and Harriet Grove.

Anne Thackeray wrote in a letter of 1875 about meeting Garnet Wolseley at "Mr Hares". She reported the comment of her sister Harriet Stephen (Minny) that Augustus Hare was exactly like John Addington Symonds "but without his niceness".

Lady Knightley came to lunch at Holmhurst in December 1896. Writing in her diary about the Queen Anne statue, she said that Hare "has put it up in the middle of a field where it looks very funny and at the same time very imposing."

The biography of Somerset Maugham by Ted Morgan mentions that Hare, whom he refers to as "the last Victorian," befriended Maugham, who became a frequent guest at Holmhurst. He commented that "The property was small, rather less than forty acres [40 acres (16 ha)], but by planning and planting he had given it something of the air of a park in a great country house."

== Later history ==
The Hastings Road (1906) by Charles George Harper described Holmhurst in the context of an area that was becoming built up:

Here the tramway poles and wires are insistently ugly, and the village or hamlet of Baldslow itself is scarce prepossessing. A roadside public-house, a gaunt windmill, a few ugly cottages, and a tin tabernacle church are its component parts. But immediately beyond that corrugated and galvanised ecclesiastical horror the road grows beautiful, overhung with trees. Here, at the entrance to a country house in the domestic-gothic sort, are two very fine clipped yew-trees. It is Holmhurst, and the trees are those christened by Mr. Hare "Huz and Buz."

After Hare's death, the house was occupied by Admiral Sir Lewis Beaumont from 1904; and then in 1908 Sir John Gordon Kennedy bought it. Emma Leycester Penrhyn, to whom the house had been left with a lifetime interest, died in 1909.

In 1913 the estate was purchased by the Community of the Holy Family. They were an Anglican order of teaching nuns, with a focus on art and scholarship. Their mother foundress, Agnes Mason, who had formed the community in London in 1896 and later brought it to Sussex, recognised the house and gardens as a piece of Italy – specifically Florence – in England. St Mary's Convent School was run by the nuns, from the 1930s to 1981. Its best-known pupil was Joanna Lumley, an "army brat" who boarded in the 1960s: "I especially loved my second boarding school, an Anglo-Catholic convent in the hills behind Hastings. The nuns wore blue stockings and were brainy and lovely. There were 70 boarders and I was happy as a clam."
