= Community of the Holy Family =

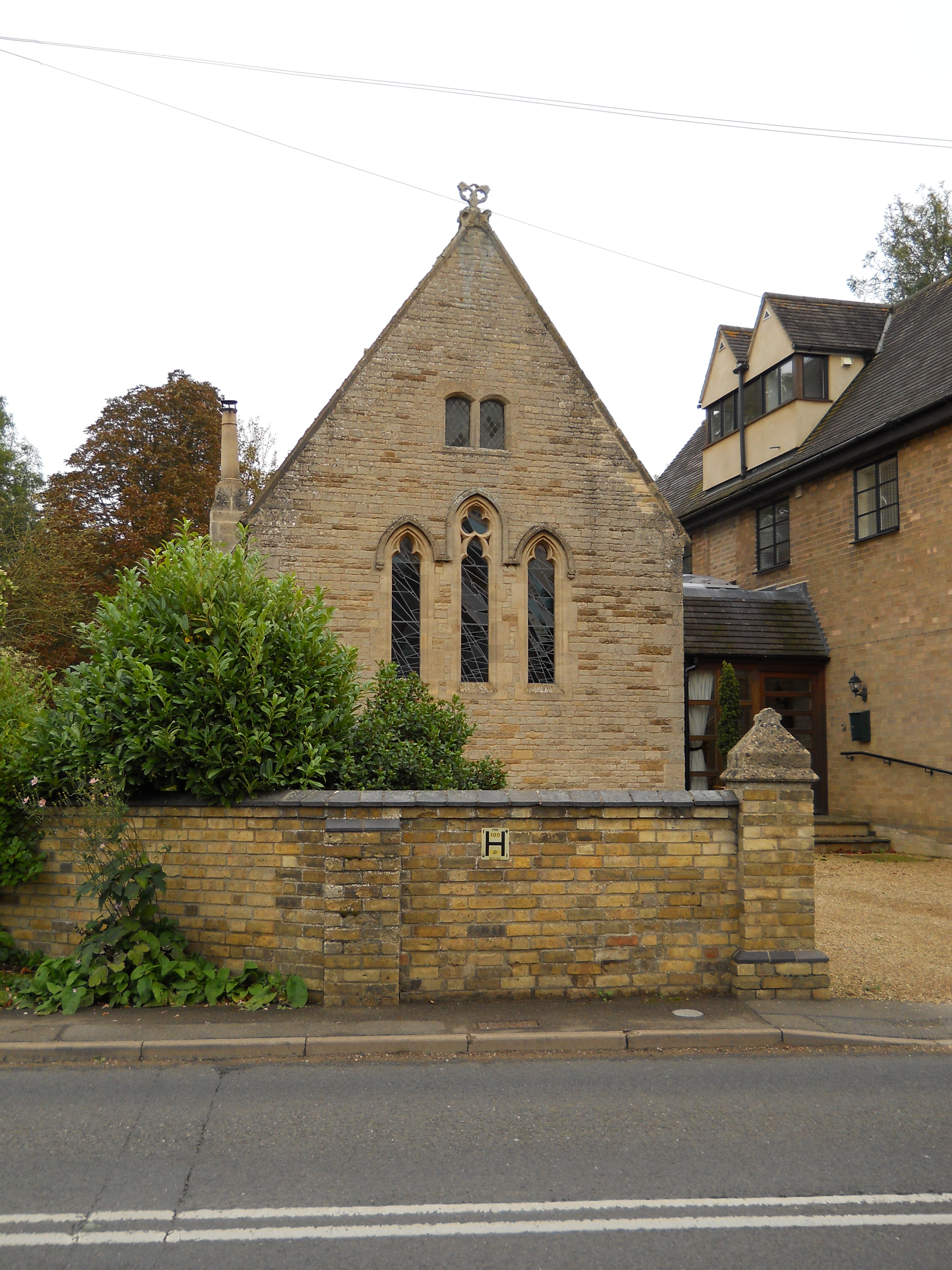
St Pega's Hermitage, Peakirk, now a private home

The Community of the Holy Family (CHF) is a former religious order of the Anglican Communion. The order of nuns, founded in the Church of England in 1896, has been refounded and is active in the United States in the independent sacramental movement.

== History ==
=== In England ===
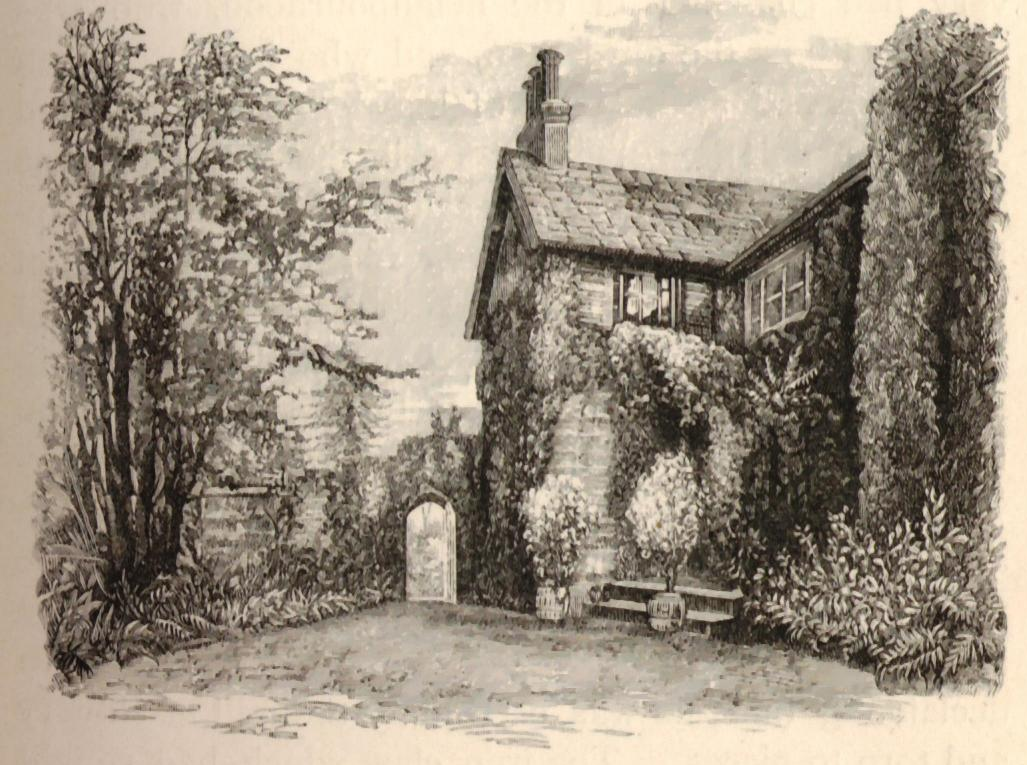
Porch of Holmhurst St Mary in East Sussex (c. 1885) by Augustus Hare

The Anglican religious order of nuns was formed of well educated young women who wished to commit themselves to educational work and evangelism. Three of the four original members, who were admitted as novices in August 1896, were graduates of Newnham College, Cambridge; one of these was Agnes Mason, the Mother Foundress.

The focus of the community's work was in London and the south-east of England, with convents and schools in the capital and in both Kent and Sussex. There was also a small branch house at Cambridge for sisters wishing to study. At Holmhurst St Mary near St Leonards-on-Sea in East Sussex, the mother house from 1913, the sisters ran a girls' school, St Mary's School, until 1981; its best-known pupil was Joanna Lumley.

From 1937, a daughter house was located at Peakirk, near Peterborough, attached to the ancient hermitage of St Pega, for those Sisters wishing to follow a more contemplative form of the religious life, although the Order's principal charism was of outreach, not enclosure. Sister Dilys left the Community at the Reverend Mother's request in 1968 and joined the more contemplative and enclosed Community of the Sisters of the Love of God at Fairacres in Oxford.

=== Overseas ===
The Community expanded overseas and ran a teacher training college, All Saints' College, at Nainital in India (1915–45).

== Decline ==
In January 1997 the remaining three sisters moved to Malling Abbey in Kent to live in the gatehouse alongside the resident Benedictine community. Two of the sisters died in 2002 and 2006. The community closed with the death of Sister Jean Beare CHF on 27 November 2010.

Sister Julia Bolton Holloway, educated by the nuns of the Community, with a doctorate in Medieval Studies from Berkeley, joined them for their final four years at Holmhurst St Mary, and following the closure of the Order she continues the ethos of the Mother Foundress for education and ecumenism, as a solitary hermit in Florence, Italy, where she is custodian of the English Cemetery, Florence. She developed a teaching ministry among Roma families around Florence.

== Revival ==
In April 2020, with permission of Sister Julia Bolton Holloway and the Diocese of Chichester, Sister Abigail Lilly rechartered the order. The revived Order sought to develop a range of teaching and educational ministries; and Sister Julia Bolton Holloway, still living and working in Italy, was the adviser of the Order.

In 2023, the sisters of the Community of the Holy Family voted to leave the Anglican Communion. It works independently within the independent sacramental movement and is a partner of the Agape Fellowship of Greater Atlanta. It has developed feministic and mystical approaches to worship and ministry and created a campus ministry programme. The order still has independent relationships with some local Episcopal churches.
