= Gurkha Justice Campaign =

British political campaign (2004–09)

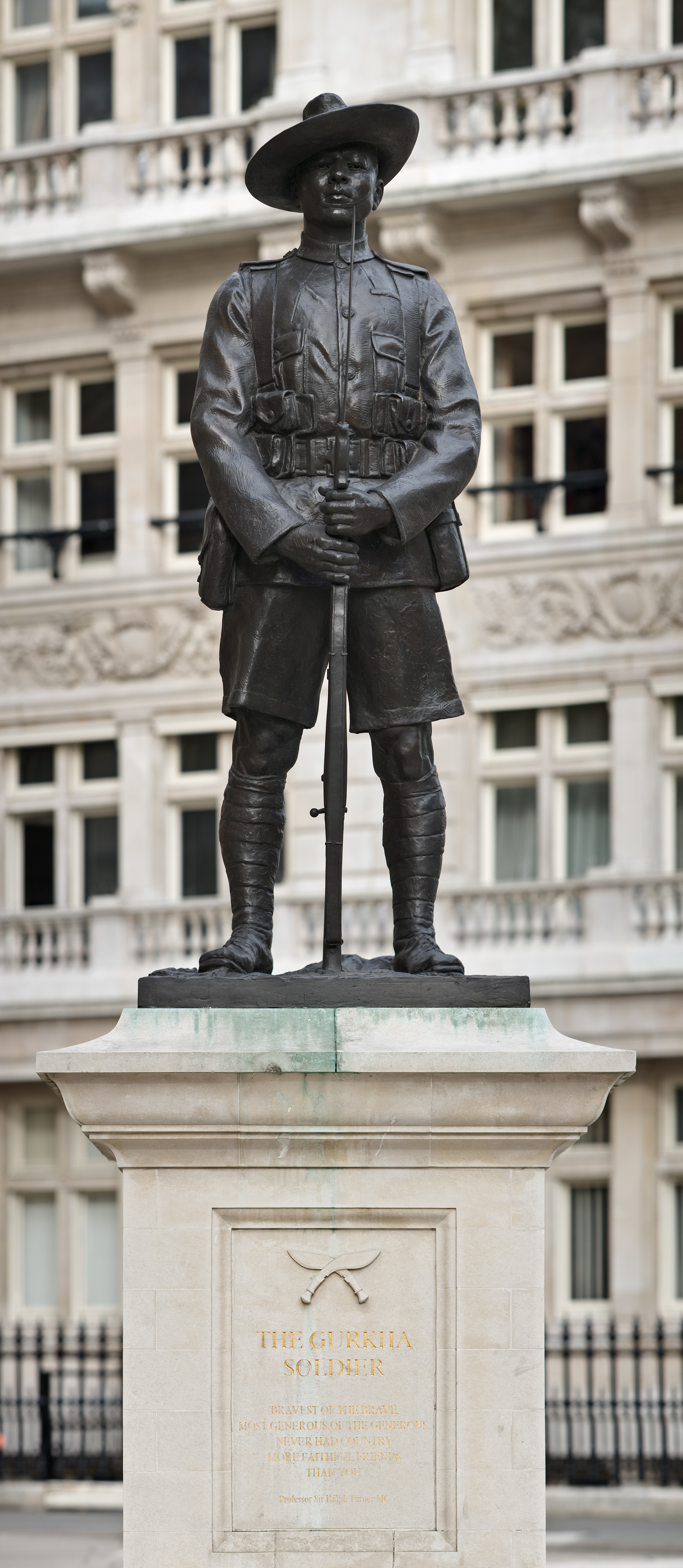
A monument to the Nepalese Gurkha Soldier near the Ministry of Defence in London

The Gurkha Justice Campaign was a successful political campaign group in the United Kingdom that sought for Gurkhas who served in the British military to gain the same rights as their British and Commonwealth counterparts.

The group wanted the law to be changed so that all Gurkhas who served in the British Army would gain the right of abode, whereas under previous legislation only service personnel from Commonwealth countries bore that right. The campaign's legal case reached the High Court, and had the support of a number of celebrities, including Joanna Lumley. The campaign eventually succeeded.

== Background ==
Until 2004 Gurkhas were not allowed to settle in the United Kingdom. However, the Labour government under Tony Blair changed the rules so that Gurkhas who retired after 1997 would be allowed to settle in the UK, 1997 being the date when the Gurkha Brigade headquarters moved from Hong Kong to Britain. Soldiers who retired before this date, however, were only allowed the same settlement rights in exceptional circumstance. The Gurkha Justice Campaign wanted the same settlement rights for all Gurkha soldiers.

In 2008, the high court ruled that the policy had been illegal since the process used to determine pre-1997 applications was deemed arbitrary. The Government of Gordon Brown agreed to produce new rules. However, when these were unveiled on 24 April 2009, the Gurkhas were furious because there was no automatic right to settle in the UK for all veterans. Indeed, Gurkhas who wanted to settle in the UK would have to meet one or more of five requirements. These were

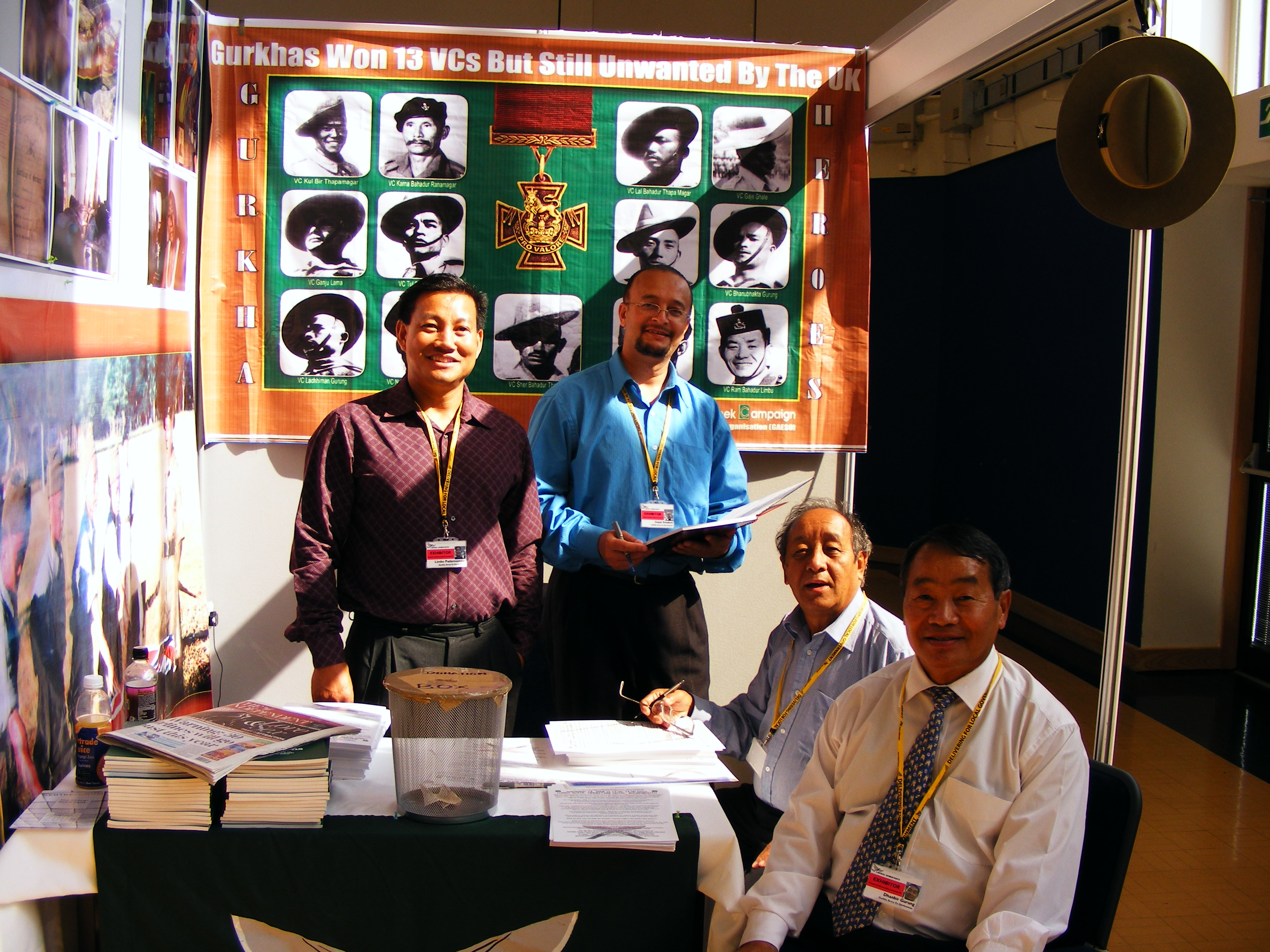
Gurkha Justice Campaigners, 2008

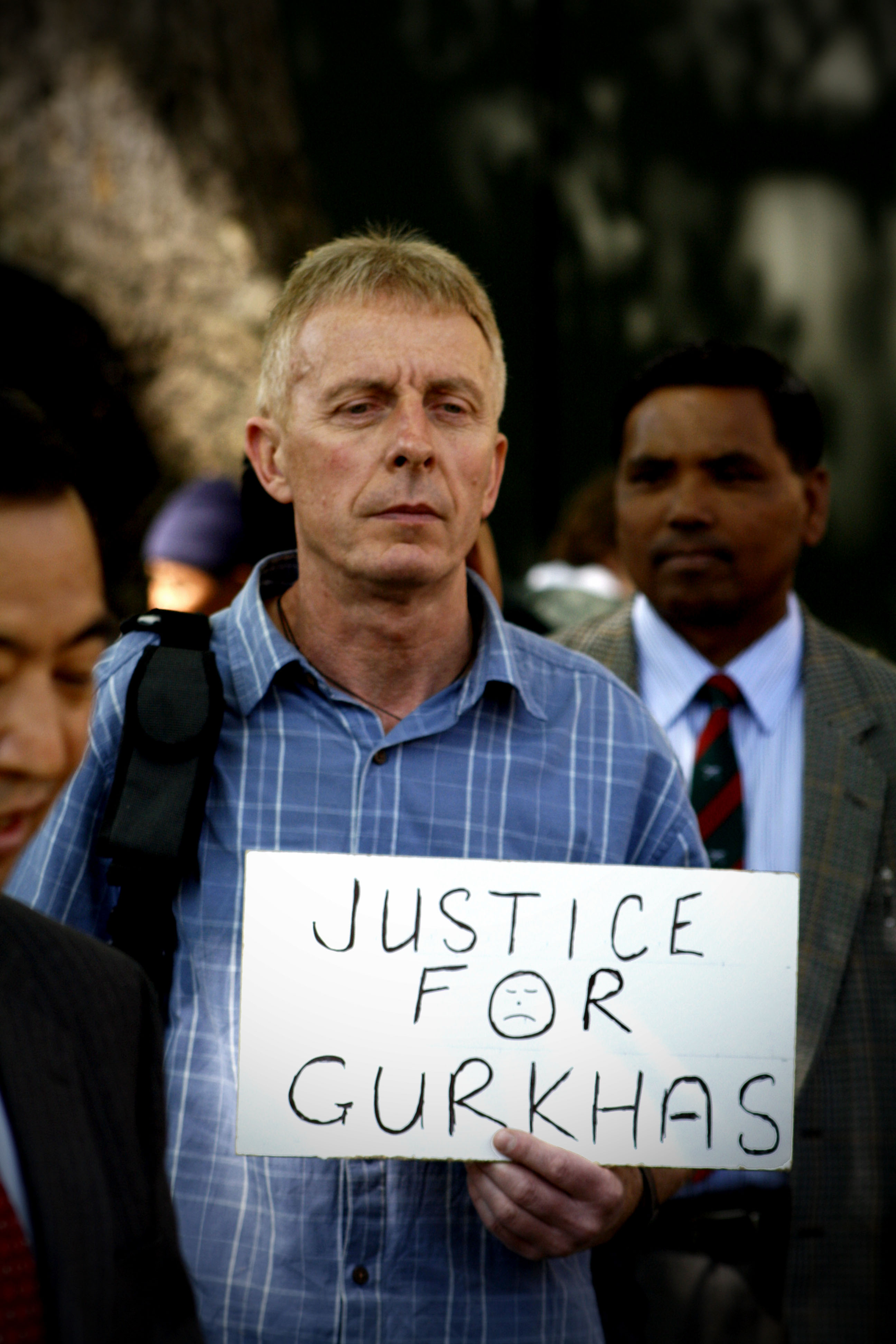
A Justice For Gurkhas rally, 2009

- Three years continuous residence in the UK during or after service
- Close family in the UK
- A bravery award of level one to three
- Service of 20 years or more in the Gurkha brigade
- Chronic or long-term medical condition caused or aggravated by service

Campaigners claimed that under the rules, only around 100 Gurkhas would qualify for residence, although the government figures suggested that as many as 4,300 would be eligible to settle. The rules would disqualify many from being able to settle in the United Kingdom, as indicated by an article which appeared in The Economist:

Veterans would be allowed to settle only if they met one or more conditions based on length of service, gallantry or related illness. Many of the requirements seemed designed to frustrate: for example, one way to qualify automatically was by soldiering for at least 20 years, though most rank-and-file Gurkhas serve for only 15. Another was to prove that a long-term medical condition was caused or worsened by active service—a tall order for those whose injuries were sustained decades ago.

The campaign was also supported by the Liberal Democrats.

== Joanna Lumley and the Gurkhas ==
In 2008 the actress Joanna Lumley, whose father served in the 6th Gurkha Rifles, became the public face of the campaign to provide all Gurkha veterans who served in the British Army before 1997 the right to settle in Britain, and ran a highly publicised and successful campaign. Those serving following 1997 had already been granted permission but the UK Government had not extended the offer to all of the Gurkhas, who are natives of Nepal. They have served Britain for almost 200 years with over 50,000 dying in service, and 13 have been awarded the Victoria Cross. On 20 November 2008, Lumley led a large all party group including Gurkhas starting from Parliament Square to 10 Downing Street with a petition signed by 250,000 people. She supports the Gurkha Justice Campaign. On 24 April 2009 she stated that she was "ashamed" of the UK administration's decision to affix five criteria to the Gurkhas' right to settle in the UK. With the support of both Opposition parties and Labour rebel MPs on 29 April 2009 a Liberal Democrat motion that all Gurkhas be offered an equal right of residence was passed, allowing Gurkhas who served before 1997 residence in the UK. Following the Government defeat, the Minister for Immigration Phil Woolas announced that a further review would be completed by the middle of July.

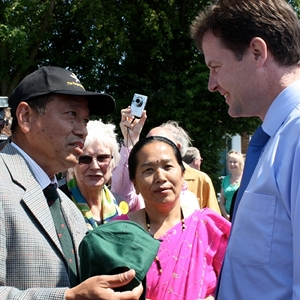
Nick Clegg being presented with a Gurkha hat by veteran Gurkha Lieutenant(Queen's Gurkha Officer) Madan Kumar Gurung during his visit to Maidstone, to celebrate the success of their joint campaign for the right to live in Britain, 2009.

On 5 May Joanna Lumley said that she had received private assurances of support from a senior member of the Royal Family, and attended a meeting with Prime Minister Gordon Brown at 10 Downing Street the following day. Afterwards she described the meeting as "extremely positive", and praised Brown, saying, "I trust him. I rely on him. And I know that he has now taken this matter into his own hands and so today is a very good day".

However, on the day following the meeting with Brown, five Gurkha veterans who had applied for residency in the United Kingdom received letters telling them that their appeals had been rejected. Lumley confronted Phil Woolas at the BBC Westminster studios about the issue and, after pursuing him around the studio, the pair held an impromptu press conference in which she pressured him into agreeing to further talks over the issue.

Following a Commons Home Affairs Committee meeting in which talks were held between campaigners, the Ministry of Defence and the Home Office on 19 May 2009, Gordon Brown announced to the House of Commons on 20 May that the Home Secretary Jacqui Smith would make a statement on the issue the following day. Smith subsequently announced that all Gurkha veterans who had served four years or more in the British Army before 1997 would be allowed to settle in Britain.

== See also ==
- Britain–India–Nepal Tripartite Agreement signed in 1947
