= Joanna Lumley =

Indian-born British actress (born 1946)

Dame Joanna Lumley DBE FRGS
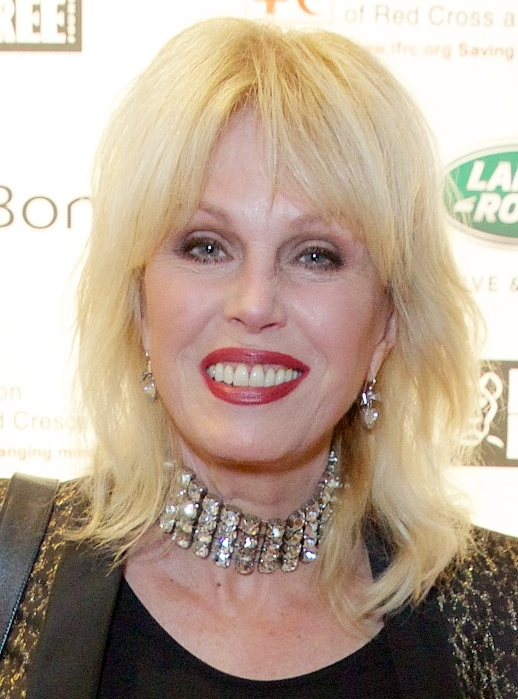
- Lumley in 2015
- Born: Joanna Lamond Lumley; 1 May 1946 (age 80); Srinagar, Jammu and Kashmir, British Raj
- Citizenship: British
- Occupations: Actress; author; activist; presenter; model; producer
- Years active: 1967–present
- Television: Coronation Street; The New Avengers; Sapphire & Steel; Absolutely Fabulous; Finding Alice
- Spouses: Jeremy Lloyd (m. 1970; div. 1971) Stephen Barlow (m. 1986)
- Children: 1

Dame Joanna Lamond Lumley (born 1 May 1946) is a British actress, presenter, author, television producer, activist and former model. She has won two BAFTA TV Awards for her role as Patsy Stone in the BBC sitcom Absolutely Fabulous (1992–2012) and was nominated for the 2011 Tony Award for Best Featured Actress in a Play for the Broadway revival of La Bête. In 2013, she received the Special Recognition Award at the National Television Awards and in 2017 she was honoured with the BAFTA Fellowship award.

Lumley's other television credits include The New Avengers (1976–1977), Sapphire & Steel (1979–1982), Sensitive Skin (2005–2007), Jam & Jerusalem (2006–2008), Finding Alice (2021) and Amandaland (2025–present). She also played Elaine Perkins in Coronation Street in 1973. Her film appearances include On Her Majesty's Secret Service (1969), Trail of the Pink Panther (1982), Curse of the Pink Panther (1983), Shirley Valentine (1989), James and the Giant Peach (1996), Ella Enchanted (2004), Corpse Bride (2005), The Wolf of Wall Street (2013) and Absolutely Fabulous: The Movie (2016). She had roles in two episodes of Are You Being Served? (1973–1975) written by Jeremy Lloyd, whom she had married and divorced three years prior to her first appearance on the show. In 2025, she played Grandmama in the American series Wednesday (2022).

Lumley is an advocate and human rights activist for Survival International and the Gurkha Justice Campaign. She supports charities and animal welfare groups, such as Compassion in World Farming and Vegetarians' International Voice for Animals. She was made a dame (DBE) in the 2022 New Year Honours for services to drama, entertainment and charity.

== Early life ==
Joanna Lamond Lumley was born on 1 May 1946 in Srinagar, Jammu and Kashmir, in British India. Lumley's parents married in 1941 and she has early memories of living in the tropics.

Lumley's mother, Thyra Beatrice Rose (née Weir), was English. Her father, Major James Rutherford Lumley, was born in Lahore (now part of Pakistan) with English and Scottish ancestry and was a direct descendant of Maj.-Gen. Sir James Rutherford Lumley. Her father served as an officer in the British Indian Army's 6th Queen Elizabeth's Own Gurkha Rifles in Burma during World War II, most notably at the Battle of Mogaung in June 1944 during which his life was saved by Tul Bahadur Pun. Maj.-Gen. Sir James Rutherford Lumley was a direct descendant of Joan Beaufort, Queen of Scots.

Lumley's grandfather Lieutenant Colonel Leslie Weir had been born in Ghazipur and served as an army officer in Kashmir; he was a close friend of the 13th Dalai Lama.

In 1954 the family went "home" on leave to England, travelling on the HMT Empire Windrush. When Lumley's parents returned to Asia, she stayed, boarding at Mickledene School in Rolvenden, Kent. She was eight years old, which she later described as "paralysingly young". From 11 to 17 she attended Holmhurst St Mary's Convent School, run by Community of the Holy Family:

"I especially loved my second boarding school, an Anglo-Catholic convent in the hills behind Hastings. The nuns wore blue stockings and were brainy and lovely. There were 70 boarders and I was happy as a clam."

Lumley attended the Lucie Clayton Finishing School in London, after being turned down by the Royal Academy of Dramatic Art at the age of 16.

== Career ==
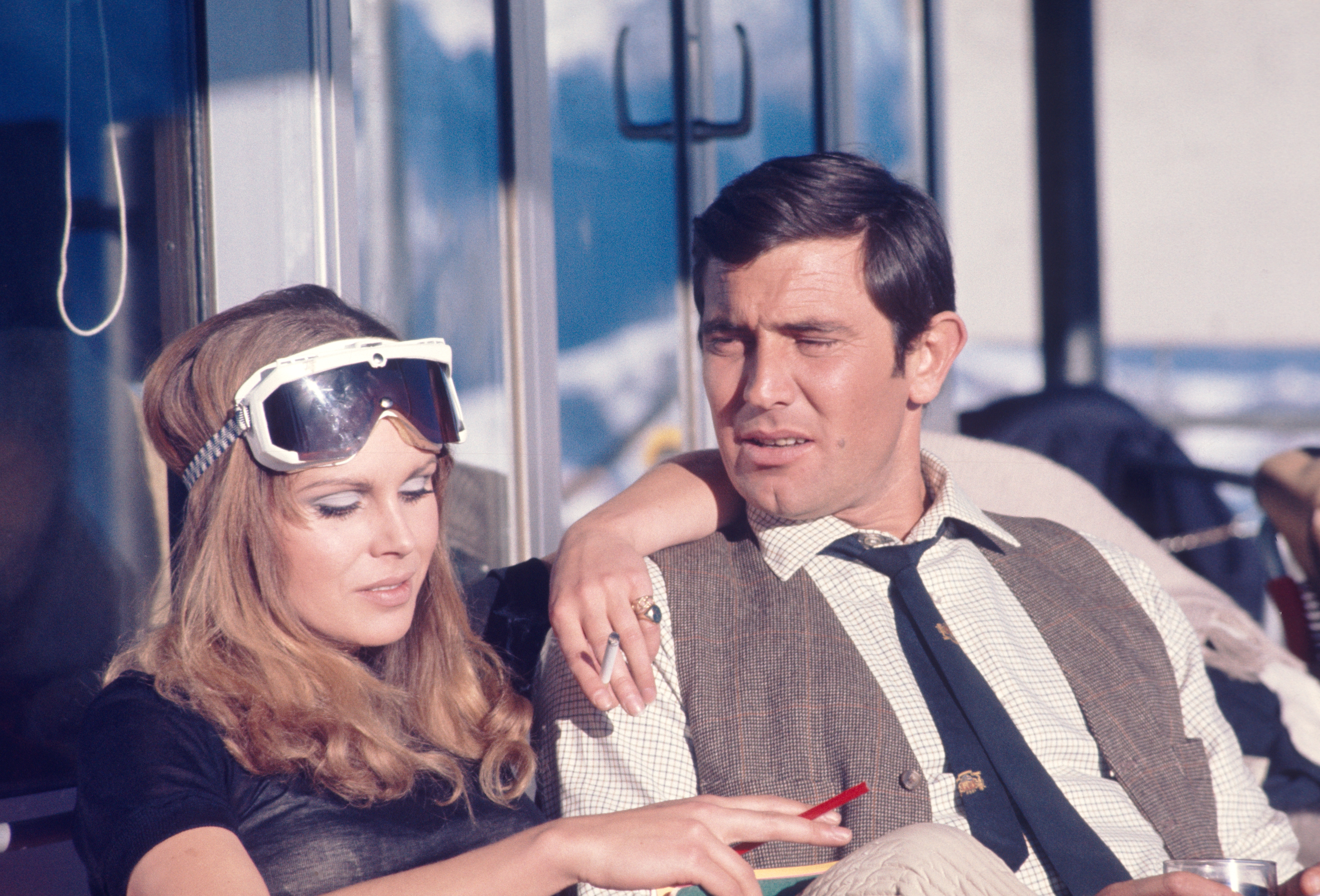
Lumley on the set of On Her Majesty's Secret Service with George Lazenby (1969)

Lumley spent three years as a photographic model, notably for Brian Duffy, who photographed her with her son, born in 1967. That year she also appeared on the BBC2 programme The Impresarios: For Appearance's Sake. She also worked as a house model for Jean Muir. Over forty years later, she participated in another photoshoot – again with her son – for Duffy as part of a retrospective of the photographer's work.

Lumley appeared in an early episode of the Bruce Forsyth Show in 1966. She appeared in a British television advertisement for Nimble Bread first screened in 1969.

Lumley did not receive any formal training at drama school. Her acting career began in 1969 with a small, uncredited role in the film Some Girls Do, and as a Bond girl in On Her Majesty's Secret Service, in which she had two lines as the English girl among the villainous Ernst Stavro Blofeld's "Angels of Death". Lumley went on to have a brief but memorable role as Elaine Perkins in Coronation Street, in which her character turned down Ken Barlow's offer of marriage, as well as roles in other popular television series such as Are You Being Served?, Steptoe and Son and The Protectors. In 1973, she made another big screen appearance as Jessica Van Helsing in The Satanic Rites of Dracula, the last Hammer Dracula film to star Christopher Lee. She also had a role in the comedy film Don't Just Lie There, Say Something! (1974) alongside Leslie Phillips and Joan Sims.

=== Major roles ===
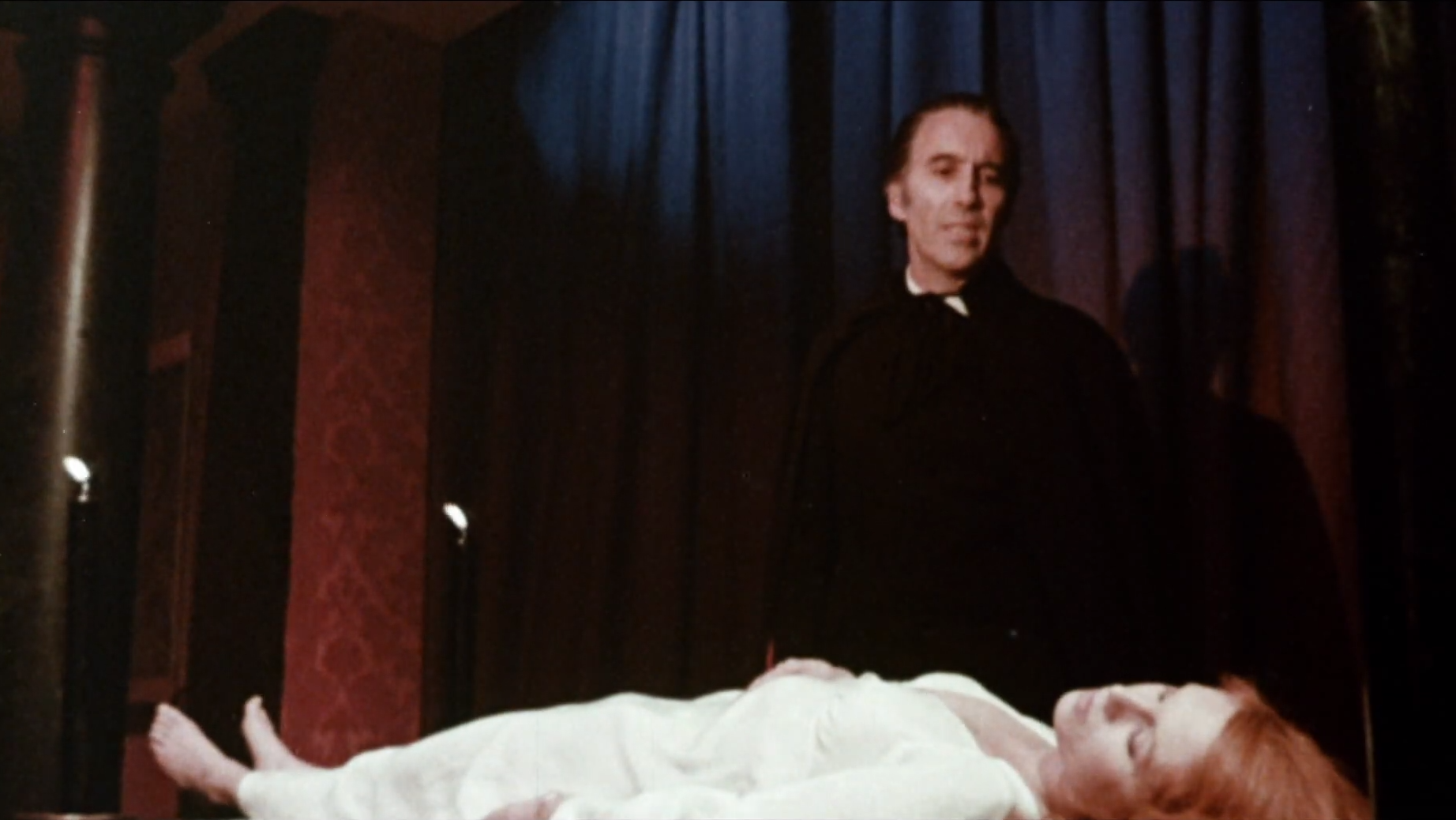
Lumley alongside Christopher Lee in The Satanic Rites of Dracula (1973)

Lumley has specialised in upper-class parts throughout her career, thanks to her voice and accent. Lumley's first major role was as Purdey in The New Avengers, successor to the secret agent series The Avengers, a role she played in all twenty-six episodes from 1976 to 1977.

In 1979, she appeared in another series which acquired a cult following: Sapphire & Steel, with David McCallum. Conceived as ITV's answer to Doctor Who, Lumley played a mysterious elemental being ("Sapphire") who, with her collaborator, "Steel", dealt with breaches in the fabric of time. In 1986, television producer Sydney Newman suggested Lumley for the role of the Doctor but his idea was dismissed.

Over a decade later Lumley's career was boosted by her portrayal of the louche, selfish and frequently drunk fashion director Patsy Stone, companion to Jennifer Saunders's Edina Monsoon in the BBC comedy television series Absolutely Fabulous (1992–1996, 2001–2004, 2011–2012). Absolutely Fabulous: The Movie was released in 2016.

From 1994 to 1995, Lumley starred alongside Nadine Garner and John Bowe in the British television show Class Act, playing the part of Kate Swift, an upper-class lady who had fallen on hard times.

Lumley's other work has included Lovejoy (as widow Victoria Cavero), In the Kingdom of the Thunder Dragon (1996), a film about a journey made by her grandparents in Bhutan, A Rather English Marriage (nominated for a BAFTA for Best Actress 1999) and Dr Willoughby (1999). In 1995, she provided the voice of Annie the rag doll in the animated series The Forgotten Toys. In 1999, she also provided the voice for Sims the chicken in the BAFTA award-winning animated series The Foxbusters. In 2000, she co-produced a new drama series The Cazalets. She appeared in a TV series on Sarawak, where she spent time in her childhood.

Lumley starred as the elderly Delilah Stagg in the 2006 sitcom Jam & Jerusalem with Dawn French, Jennifer Saunders, and Sue Johnston. In July 2007, she starred in the second series of the drama Sensitive Skin where she played the main character Davina Jackson. The BBC said this would be the final series of the dark comedy.

Lumley has worked with Tim Burton on two film projects, in James and the Giant Peach (1996) and Corpse Bride (2005). She has also appeared alongside Hugh Laurie in the British romantic comedy Maybe Baby (2000) and alongside Anne Hathaway in Ella Enchanted (2004). She has appeared twice as Mrs. Dolly Bantry in Agatha Christie's Marple, in the episodes: 'The Body in the Library' (2004) and 'The Mirror Crack'd from Side to Side' (2009). In 2010, she appeared in a 4-episode guest arc on the BBC drama, Mistresses as Vivienne Roden. In 2013, she appeared in the Martin Scorsese crime drama, The Wolf of Wall Street.

Lumley starred in David Hirson's La Bête at the Comedy Theatre, London, 26 June–28 August 2010 with David Hyde Pierce and Mark Rylance, directed by Matthew Warchus; and also at the Music Box Theatre, Broadway, New York, opening on 14 October 2010. She was nominated for the Tony Award for Best Featured Actress in a Play for her performance.

== Media work ==
Lumley, who has one of the most recognised voices in the UK, has gained prominence as a voice-over artist. Users of AOL in the United Kingdom are familiar with Joanna Lumley's voice. She recorded the greetings "Welcome", "You have email" and "Goodbye" for that company.

From 2004 to 2006 she appeared in adverts for insurance brokers Privilege.

Lumley appeared on the last run of ITV's Parkinson as a guest, on 27 October 2007, discussing the subject of young girls in the UK. She was asked to write the introduction to a revised edition in November 2007 of the book called The Magic Key to Charm written by the journalist Eileen Ascroft. This is a book of tips to women, first written by Ascroft in 1938 about how to be glamorous. "I thought it was absolutely enchanting, it's how young women were told how to behave in the old days and I think it might be just coming back for a bit of a revival", she explained in the interview.

"Because, I have to say I adore our young ones and I think we have got some of the prettiest and loveliest girls in the world but I think sometimes the behaviour gets a bit bad and I think the girls let themselves down. They are so pretty and so lovely but they should behave better, I think, then they will be more successful."

In 1999 she appeared in the Comic Relief Doctor Who parody The Curse of Fatal Death as the final incarnation of the Doctor. She also appeared with Jennifer Saunders, Dawn French and Sienna Miller in the French and Saunders pastiche of Mamma Mia for Comic Relief 2009 in which she played the role of Tanya (named Patsy in the spoof).

In 2004 Lumley appeared as the "Woman with the Sydney Opera House Head" in Dirk Maggs's long-awaited radio adaptation of the third book of the Douglas Adams series The Hitchhiker's Guide to the Galaxy.

In 2005 she published her autobiography, No Room for Secrets, which was serialised by The Times, for which she was once a regular contributor.

In September 2008, the BBC aired Joanna Lumley in the Land of the Northern Lights, a documentary about her search to see the Northern Lights in northern Norway.

In 2009 she portrayed a rock star, believed to have been dead for 35 years, and her twin, in the "Counter Culture Blues" episode of the British television mystery series Lewis (known in the U.S. as Inspector Lewis).

In 2011, Lumley appeared in Uptown Downstairs Abbey, the Comic Relief parody of the critically acclaimed historical television dramas Downton Abbey and Upstairs Downstairs. Playing herself and the character of Mrs. Danvers, she starred alongside others including Jennifer Saunders, Kim Cattrall, Victoria Wood, Harry Enfield, Patrick Barlow, Dale Winton, Olivia Colman and Tim Vine.

In recent years, Lumley has worked extensively on ITV, and in 2010 Lumley was executive producer and presenter of Joanna Lumley's Nile, where she journeyed up the River Nile from sea to source in Rwanda, for ITV. This was broadcast in four parts on ITV beginning on 12 April 2010, and repeated in June 2013.

Lumley travelled again for ITV in 2011, this time visiting Greece for a four-part series titled Joanna Lumley's Greek Odyssey. The series aired on ITV beginning on 13 October. Once again, in 2012, Lumley travelled for ITV, now in search of Noah's Ark. The trip, which encompassed 3 continents and also involved an adventurous jaunt into Iran, aired in late 2012 as a single 90-minute documentary titled Joanna Lumley's Ark.

In March 2014 she appeared in a BBC One hour-long documentary featuring American musician will.i.am. The programme was called Joanna Lumley Meets will.i.am. In December 2014, she presented Bette Midler: One Night Only, a one-off ITV special.

In 2015 she presented a three-part factual series for ITV called Joanna Lumley's Trans-Siberian Adventure. The series saw Lumley travel 6400 miles from Hong Kong to Moscow, along the Trans-Siberian Railway.

In September 2016, she presented Joanna Lumley's Japan, a three-part documentary series for ITV and in July 2017, she presented Joanna Lumley's India for ITV.

In 2018 she presented Joanna Lumley's Silk Road Adventure, a four-part travelogue covering eight countries which were part of the ancient trade route.

In May 2024, Lumley was announced as the UK's jury spokesperson for the final of the Eurovision Song Contest 2024.

== Activism ==
Lumley supports over 60 charities. She is an advocate for the Free Tibet campaign, and the Prospect Burma charity, which offers grants to Burmese students, for whom she broadcast a BBC Radio 4 charity appeal in 2001. In August 2015, Lumley backed children's fairytales app "GivingTales" in aid of UNICEF together with other high profile British celebrities. In July 2021, Lumley joined an international line-up of actors in backing calls for the Great Barrier Reef to be placed on a list of world heritage sites currently in danger.

=== Gurkha Justice Campaign ===
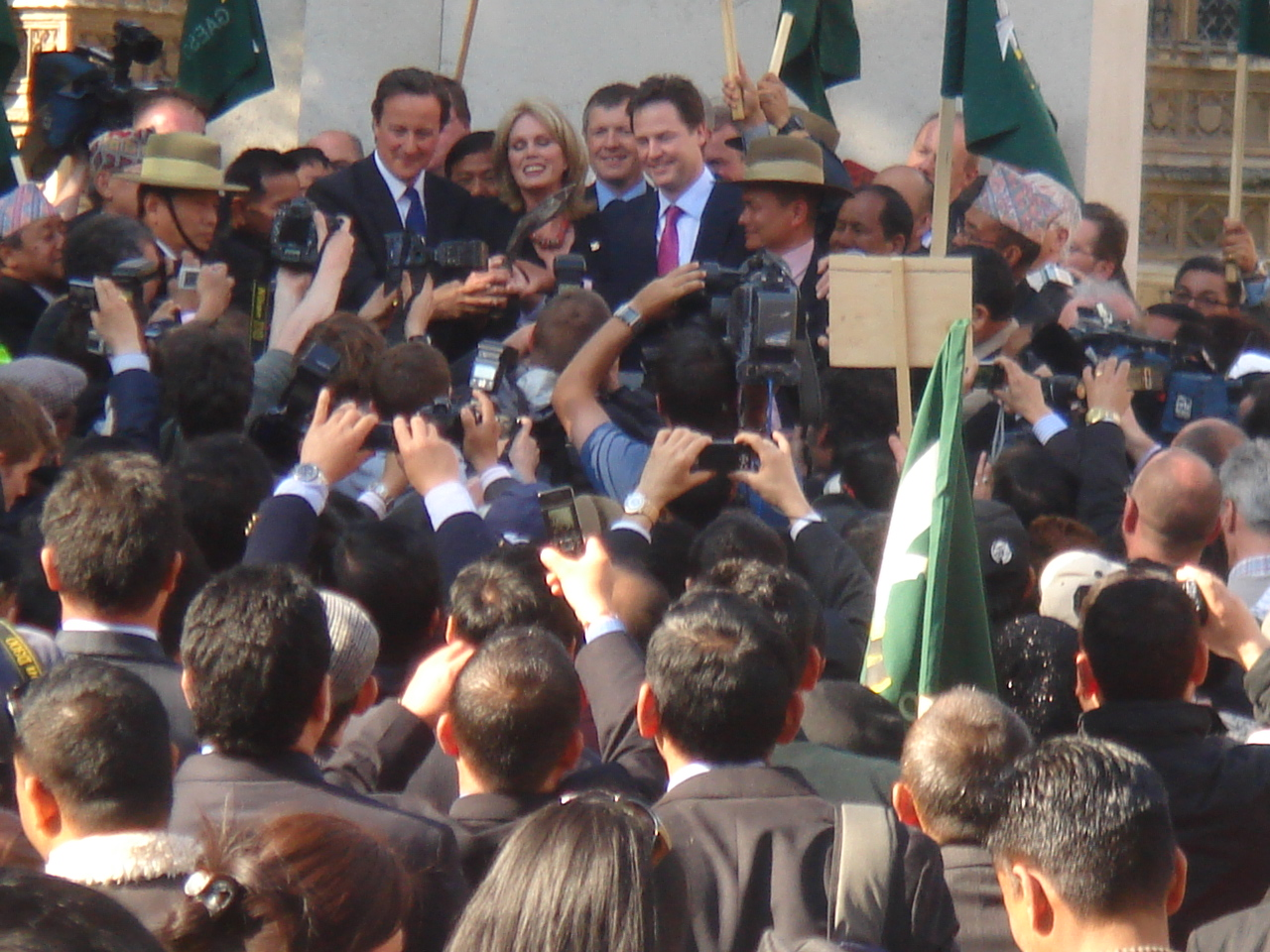
Lumley with David Cameron, Bob Russell and the Liberal Democrat leader, Nick Clegg, celebrating the vote in favour of giving Gurkha veterans right of residence

Lumley has a long association and interest in Nepal and its people that grew out of her father's service in 6th Gurkha Rifles.

In 2008, Lumley became the public face of the Gurkha Justice Campaign, a campaign to provide all Nepalese origin Gurkha veterans who served in the British Army before 1997 the right to settle in the United Kingdom. Those serving following 1997 had already been granted permission, but the British Government had not extended the offer to all of the Gurkhas. On 20 November 2008, Lumley led a large all-party group including Gurkhas starting from Parliament Square to 10 Downing Street with a petition signed by 250,000 people.

On 24 April 2009, she stated that she was "ashamed" of the UK administration's decision to affix five criteria to the Gurkhas' right to settle in the UK. With the support of both Opposition parties and Labour rebel MPs on 29 April 2009, a Liberal Democrat motion that all Gurkhas be offered an equal right of residence was passed, allowing Gurkhas who served before 1997 residence in the UK and access to housing, social security and healthcare. Following the Government defeat, the Minister for Immigration Phil Woolas stated that a further review would be completed by the middle of July.

On 5 May 2009, Lumley said that she had received private assurances of support from "a senior member of the Royal Family", and attended a meeting with Prime Minister Gordon Brown at 10 Downing Street the following day. Afterwards, she described the meeting as "extremely positive", and praised Mr Brown, saying, "I trust him. I rely on him. And I know that he has now taken this matter into his own hands and so today is a very good day."

However, on the day following the meeting with Brown, five Gurkha veterans who had applied for residency in the United Kingdom received letters telling them that their appeals had been rejected – many saw this as a betrayal, despite the fact that for the letters to have been received the day after the meeting they might have been sent before it (and certainly following the 29 April Commons vote). Lumley confronted Phil Woolas at the BBC Westminster studios about the issue and, after her pursuing him around the studio, the pair held an impromptu press conference in which Woolas agreed to accept Gurkha Justice Campaign input in developing new guidelines by July while giving sympathetic treatment to Gurkhas not meeting the then current immigration guidelines before the development of new guidelines.

Following a Commons Home Affairs Committee meeting in which talks were held between campaigners, the Ministry of Defence and the Home Office on 19 May, all Gurkha veterans who had served four years or more in the British Army before 1997 were given the right to settle in Britain.

Lumley's success in campaigning prompted calls for her to stand as a Member of Parliament at the 2010 general election. However, she dismissed the suggestion. During an appearance on Friday Night with Jonathan Ross on 29 May 2009, she reiterated that she had no desire to stand for election to the House of Commons.

In July 2009, Lumley went on a visit to Nepal. Upon her arrival at Tribhuvan International Airport, she was greeted by crowds of Gurkha supporters. Lumley said in a statement, "I feel so humbled by the fact I'm going to meet so many ex-Gurkhas and their families, and see where they are and how they live." While there, Lumley was hailed 'Daughter of Nepal' by the crowds of fans at the airport.

Lumley become vice patron of The Gurkha Welfare Trust in 2009.

=== Work for Survival International ===
Lumley has long been a supporter of Survival International and the cause of indigenous rights, and narrated Survival's documentary, Mine: Story of a Sacred Mountain. The film tells the story of the remote Dongria Kondha tribe in India and their battle to stop a vast bauxite mine from destroying their land and way of life. In defence of the Dongria, she has said,

"It greatly disturbs me that a British company will be responsible for the destruction of these wonderful people. I urge the public to support the Dongria, who simply want to be allowed to live in peace. Unlike so many of India's rural poor, the Dongria actually live very well in the Niyamgiri hills, and it's a terrible irony that what Vedanta is proposing to do in the name of 'development' will actually destroy this completely self-sufficient people."

Lumley also contributed her writing for the book We Are One: A Celebration of Tribal Peoples, released in October 2009 with profits going in support of Survival. A collection of photographs, statements from tribal people and essays from international authors, the book explores the richness of the cultures of indigenous peoples around the world and the risks to their existence. In her essay for the book, Lumley speaks of the Dongria way of life and the threats they face in the name of corporate interests, and calls for action to stop such decisions.

=== London Garden Bridge ===
Lumley first lobbied for a garden bridge across London's River Thames in the late 1990s as a memorial to the late Diana, Princess of Wales; this campaign was unsuccessful. In 2002 she presented detailed plans (produced by engineering group Arup) for the bridge to then Mayor of London Ken Livingstone; this bid was also rejected. In 2012 days after the re-election of Boris Johnson as Mayor of London Lumley sent an effusive congratulatory letter to him outlining her proposal for the bridge. It was later revealed that she felt confident of a favourable response from Johnson as she had known him "since he was four years old". Thomas Heatherwick was proposed by Lumley as the designer for the bridge; he is mentioned favourably in her 2004 autobiography.

The Johnson-chaired Transport for London body initiated a competition for a new central London cross-river footbridge. Three firms were invited to submit proposals and Heatherwick Studios won the competition despite having never previously built a bridge on the proposed scale unlike the losing practices which had built very many. This outcome proved highly controversial. Equally the subsequent funding arrangements for the bridge attracted criticism. These included "unorthodox" circumvention of official procedures for public money use by then Chancellor of the Exchequer George Osborne, and a £10,000 taxpayer-funded trip by Johnson, Heatherwick and Sir Edward Lister to Apple Computer in San Francisco seeking sponsorship for the bridge (the bid failed). Escalating cost estimates for the project topped out at around £200 million leading to withdrawal of pledged private sponsorship.

This together with strong opposition from local residents created ever-greater scrutiny of the proposals. It became clear that the bridge would be closed at night, involve the felling of 30 mature trees and effectively privatise long-held public space in central London. Lumley also reversed her position on cycleway provision for the bridge.

Johnson continued to support the failing project until his very last day in office; attempting to shore up its funding with last minute manoeuvring to guarantee public money for the by then £70m shortfall.

Following the election of Sadiq Khan in 2016 Mayoral support for the project was withdrawn (finally in August 2017) in the face of lack of funds and persistent planning issues.

£46.4m of public money had been spent. A Khan-commissioned report concluded that the "business case for the bridge was flimsy and that the procurement process in which Heatherwick Studio won the contract was “not open, fair or competitive”.

Lumley made little comment on the fiasco until in 2017, interviewed by The Times newspaper she stated that the cancellation was “absolutely shattering, devastating... The negativity troubles me in my heart. I hope we’re not turning into the sort of country that instantly says no before it considers saying yes. A nation that just pulls the shutters down. The silent majority still love the bridge, but of course they were not asked what they think."

=== Research fellowship ===
In 1996, the Lumley Research Fellowship was established at Green College, University of Oxford. Sponsored by Friends Provident financial group, it was for a young researcher on "major environmental or wildlife issues, with particular reference to Africa". The candidates were interviewed by Lumley.

=== Other patronage ===
Since 1984 Lumley has been a patron of Born Free Foundation founded in the same year by the stars of the popular wildlife film Born Free, Bill Travers and Virginia McKenna. The Foundation (originally called Zoo Check), campaigns to 'keep wildlife in the wild'. She has fronted a number of the charity's campaigns, including the relocation of endangered giraffe in Kenya and, in 2020, narrating a short film entitled 'Protect Them, Protect Us', concerning the relentless exploitation and consumption of wildlife and the natural world, and its link with the COVID-19 pandemic. Following the death of Bill Travers in 1994, Lumley remains a close friend of McKenna and her eldest son, Will Travers, who is the charity's executive president.

Lumley has been a patron of the UK charity Tree Aid, since 1993. The organisation aims to enable communities in Africa's drylands to fight poverty and become self-reliant, while improving the environment.

In May 2016, Lumley became a patron of Population Matters, an organisation campaigning for the achievement of a sustainable global population size.

Lumley is also a patron of the Pastoral and Environmental Network in the Horn of Africa (PENHA). PENHA is an African inspired and led international nongovernmental organization (INGO) and research institute, founded in 1989 by a group of development practitioners concerned about the future of pastoralism in the Horn of Africa.

Another charity which Lumley is a patron of is Kids for Kids, helping children in Darfur, Sudan.

Lumley is also a patron of the Peter Pan Moat Brae Trust. Moat Brae was the favourite place for author J. M. Barrie to play as a child and the house and gardens are said to have inspired Barrie to create Peter Pan. The trust is undertaking a £4 million fundraising project to renovate the Georgian house and gardens to operate as an educational and cultural centre for local schools and Barrie enthusiasts and scholars.

Lumley is a patron of the UK environmental charity Earth Restoration Service. which supports environmental restoration programmes in UK schools, particularly by planting trees and wildflower meadows. In 2008, she spoke on behalf of the charity in the House of Lords to argue for a strong and more widespread environmental movement across the world, and in 2009 she provided the voice over for a short animated film produced by the charity.

Lumley is patron of the UK charity Trust in Children which aims to help children from poor backgrounds to access education and opportunities for non-academic development.

=== Politics ===
In May 2009 Lumley supported the Green Party during the 2009 European Elections campaign. For Lumley, the work of Green MEPs in the European Parliament in pursuing human rights and animal rights made the Green Party "the obvious choice" and urged UK voters "to cast a positive vote for a better future by voting Green in the European Elections." Lumley also appeared in literature to support changing the British electoral system from first-past-the-post to alternative vote for electing Members of Parliament to the House of Commons in the Alternative Vote referendum in 2011.

In 2010, Lumley donated £1,000 to Caroline Lucas's campaign to become the first Green Party MP during the 2010 general election campaign. She endorsed the parliamentary candidacy of Lucas at the 2015 general election.

== Influence ==
In February 2013, Lumley was assessed as one of the 100 most influential women in the United Kingdom by BBC Radio 4's Woman's Hour.

== Personal life ==
Lumley's son was born in 1967. His father is photographer Michael Claydon. She was briefly married to actor Jeremy Lloyd between 1970 and 1971. She married the conductor Stephen Barlow in 1986; they live in Central London. They also own a house near the village of Penpont, Dumfriesshire, in Scotland.

Lumley has been a vegetarian for over 40 years.

In July 2023, Lumley revealed that she has prosopagnosia, a condition which impairs face perception.

== Awards and honours ==
Lumley was appointed an Officer of the Order of the British Empire (OBE) in the 1995 New Year Honours for services to drama, and promoted to Dame Commander of the Order of the British Empire (DBE) in the 2022 New Year Honours for services to drama, entertainment and charitable causes.

Elected a Fellow of the Royal Geographical Society (FRGS) in 1982, Lumley was awarded an Honorary Doctor of Letters (Hon. D.Litt.) by the University of Kent in July 1994. In 2002, she was awarded an honorary degree by Oxford Brookes University. In 2006, she was awarded an Honorary Doctor of Letters (Hon. D.Litt.) by the University of St Andrews.

In July 2008, she was awarded an Honorary Doctor of the University (Hon DUniv) by Queen's University Belfast, and in March 2019, she and her husband were both awarded honorary doctorates by the University of Chester.

== Performances and works ==
=== Film ===
Year	Title	Role	Notes
1969	Some Girls Do	Second Robot Saboteur	
1969	On Her Majesty's Secret Service	The English Girl	
1970	The Breaking of Bumbo	Susie	
1970	Tam Lin	Georgia	
1971	Games That Lovers Play	Fanny Hill	
1971	The House That Dripped Blood	Film Crew Girl	
1971	The Abominable Dr. Phibes	Laboratory Assistant	Scene deleted
1973	The Satanic Rites of Dracula	Jessica Van Helsing	
1974	Don't Just Lie There, Say Something!	Miss Parkyn	
1982	Trail of the Pink Panther	Marie Jouvet	
1983	Curse of the Pink Panther	Countess Chandra	
1989	Shirley Valentine	Marjorie Majors	
1995	Innocent Lies	Lady Helena Graves	
1995	Cold Comfort Farm	Mrs. Mary Smiling	
1996	James and the Giant Peach	Aunt Spiker	
1997	Prince Valiant	Morgan le Fay	
1999	Parting Shots	Freda	
1999	Mad Cows	Gillian	
2000	Maybe Baby	Sheila	
2000	Whispers: An Elephant's Tale	Half Tusk	Voice
2001	The Cat's Meow	Elinor Glyn	
2003	Standing Room Only	Last in Line	Short film
2004	EuroTrip	Hostel Clerk	
2004	Ella Enchanted	Dame Olga	
2005	The Magic Roundabout	Ermintrude	Voice
2005	Corpse Bride	Maudeline Everglot	Voice
2006	Dolls	Madame Muscat	Short film
2009	Boogie Woogie	Alfreda Rhinegold	
2009	Professor Layton and the Eternal Diva	Stella	Voice
2010	Animals United	Giselle	Voice
2011	Late Bloomers	Charlotte	
2013	The Wolf of Wall Street	Aunt Emma	
2014	Death Knight Love Story	Lady Blameaux	Voice
2014	She's Funny That Way	Vivian Claremont	
2015	Absolutely Anything	Fenella	
2016	Me Before You	Mary Rawlinson	
2016	Absolutely Fabulous: The Movie	Patsy Stone	
2017	The Man You're Not	Joanna Lumley	
2017	Paddington 2	Felicity Fanshaw	
2017	Finding Your Feet	Jackie	
2020	Falling for Figaro	Meghan Geoffrey-Bishop	
2021	The Picture of Dorian Gray	Lady Narborough	
2026	Frank and Percy †		Post-production

=== Television ===
Year	Title	Role	Notes
Unknown	Emergency Ward 10	Patient	Unknown
1969	The Wednesday Play	Elsie Engelfield	Episode: "The Mark III Wife"
1971	Comedy Playhouse	Samantha Ryder-Ross	Episode: "It's Awfully Bad for Your Eyes Darling"
1971	It's Awfully Bad for Your Eyes, Darling	Samantha Ryder-Ross	All 7 episodes
1972	Steptoe and Son	Bunty	Episode: "Loathe Story"
1973	The Protectors	Liz	Episode: "Petard"
1973	Are You Being Served?	Miss French	Episode: "His and Hers"
1973	Coronation Street	Elaine Perkins	8 episodes
1975	General Hospital	Sylvia Johnson	6 episodes
1975	Are You Being Served?	German Lady	Episode: "German Week"
1976	Up the Workers	Georgina	6 episodes
1976	The Cuckoo Waltz	Harriet Paulden	Episode: "Babysitter'"
1976–1977	The New Avengers	Purdey	All 26 episodes BAFTA win – "Special Award" (2000)
1979	The Plank	Model	Short
1979–1982	Sapphire & Steel	Sapphire	All 34 episodes
1981	The Morecambe & Wise Show	Herself	1 episode
1981–1985	The Kenny Everett Television Show	Various	5 episodes
1983	The Weather in the Streets	Kate	Television film
1984	Mistral's Daughter	Lally Longbridge	Miniseries
1984	The Glory Boys	Helen	Television film
1984	Oxbridge Blues	Gigi	Episode: "That Was Tory"
1986	The Two Ronnies	Miss Dibley	1 episode
1990	A Ghost in Monte Carlo	Lady Drayton	Television film
1991	A Perfect Hero	Loretta Stone	Miniseries
1991–1994	The Full Wax	Joanna Lumley	4 episodes
1992	Lovejoy	Victoria Cavero	3 episodes
1992–1996; 2001–2004; 2011–2012	Absolutely Fabulous	Patsy Stone	All 39 episodes British Comedy Award win – "Best Comedy Actress" (1993); BAFTA win – "Best Light Entertainment Performance" (1993); BAFTA win – "Best Comedy Performance" (1995); BAFTA nomination – "Best Comedy Performance" (1996); BAFTA nomination – "Best Comedy Performance" (1997); BAFTA nomination – "Best Comedy Performance" (2002)
1993	Cluedo	Mrs Peacock	6 episodes
1994–1995	Class Act	Kate Swift	All 14 episodes
1995	The Forgotten Toys	Annie	Voice; all 26 episodes
1996	Roseanne	Patsy Stone	Episode: "Satan, Darling"
1998	The Tale of Sweeney Todd	Mrs. Lovett	Television film
1998	A Rather English Marriage	Liz Franks	Television film BAFTA nomination – "Best Actress"
1998	Coming Home	Diana Carey-Lewis	2 episodes
1999	Dr Willoughby	Donna Sinclair	All 6 episodes
1999	The Curse of Fatal Death	The Female Doctor	Comic Relief special
1999	Alice in Wonderland	Tiger Lily	Television film
1999	Nancherrow	Diana Carey-Lewis	Miniseries
1999–2000	Foxbusters	Sims	Voice; all 26 episodes
2000	Mirrorball	Jackie Riviera	Pilot
2002	Up in Town	Madison Blakelock	British Comedy Award nomination – "Best Comedy Actress"
2004, 2011	Agatha Christie's Marple	Dolly Bantry	2 episodes (The Body in the Library and The Mirror Crack'd from Side to Side)
2005–2007	Sensitive Skin	Davina Jackson	All 12 episodes
2006–2008	Jam & Jerusalem	Delilah Stagg	6 episodes
2009	Lewis	Esme Ford	Episode: "Counter Culture Blues"
2010	Mistresses	Vivienne Roden	4 episodes
2011	Uptown Downstairs Abbey	Mrs. Danvers / Herself	Comic Relief special
2012	Little Crackers	Magazine Editor	Episode: "Joanna Lumley's Little Cracker: Baby, Be Blonde"
2012	The Making of a Lady	Lady Maria Byrne	Television film
2013	Jonathan Creek	Rosalind Tartikoff	Episode: "The Clue of the Savant's Thumb"
2013	Gangsta Granny	Queen Elizabeth II	TV film
2017	Carnage	Joanna Lumley	Mockumentary
2019	Bodyguard	Prime Minister	Comic Relief special entitled Red Nose Bodyguard
2020	The Wonderful World of Mickey Mouse	Narrator	Episode: "The Brave Little Squire"
2021	Finding Alice	Sarah	All 6 episodes
2021	Motherland	Felicity	Series 3 episode 3
2022	Motherland	Felicity	Christmas Special
2023	Summer Camp Island	Susie McCallister (at 97 years old)	Episodes: "Night Pockets" & "Retrace Our Hooves"
2024	Fool Me Once	Judith Burkett	Main role
2025-present	Amandaland	Felicity	13 episodes
2025-present	Wednesday	Grandmama Hester Frump	(Main Season 3; Recurring Season 2)
2025	The Room in the Tower	Mrs Stone	Lead role

=== Non-acting television ===
Key
†	Denotes television productions that have not yet been released

Year	Title	Role	Notes
1978	Whodunnit?	Panelist	TV game show
1991	In Search of the White Rajahs	Herself	Documentary
1994	Girl Friday	Herself	Special
1997	Joanna Lumley in the Kingdom of the Thunder Dragon	Herself	
2008	Joanna Lumley in the Land of the Northern Lights	Herself	Documentary
2008	Ian Fleming: Where Bond Began	Herself	Documentary
2009	Joanna Lumley Catwoman	Herself	Documentary
2010	Joanna Lumley's Nile	Herself	Documentary series
2011	Joanna Lumley's Greek Odyssey	Herself	Documentary series
2012	Joanna Lumley: The Search for Noah's Ark	Herself	Documentary
2014	Joanna Lumley Meets will.i.am	Herself	Documentary
2014	Bette Midler: One Night Only	Herself/host	TV special
2015	Joanna Lumley's Trans-Siberian Adventure	Herself/host	Documentary series
2015	Joanna Lumley: Elvis and Me	Herself/host	Documentary
2016	Joanna Lumley's Japan	Herself/host	Documentary series
2017	Ant & Dec's Saturday Night Takeaway	Herself	"The Missing Crown Jewels" mini-series
2017	Joanna Lumley's Postcards	Herself/presenter	Documentary series
2017	Joanna Lumley's India	Herself/presenter	Documentary series
2017	Joanna & Jennifer: Absolutely Champers	Herself/co-presenter	One-off documentary
2017	Poetry Off the Page	Narrator	Television film
2018	71st British Academy Film Awards	Herself/presenter	
2018	Joanna Lumley's Silk Road Adventure	Herself/presenter	Documentary series
2020	Joanna Lumley's Hidden Caribbean: Havana to Haiti	Herself/presenter	Documentary series
2020	Joanna Lumley's Unseen Adventures	Herself/presenter	Documentary series
2020	Heathrow: Britain's Busiest Airport	Narrator	Documentary series
2021	Joanna Lumley's Home Sweet Home – Travels in My Own Land (a.k.a. Joanna Lumley's Britain)	Herself/presenter	Documentary series
2021	Joanna Lumley and the Human Swan	Herself/presenter	Documentary series
2022	Joanna Lumley's Great Cities of the World	Herself/presenter	Documentary series
2022	RuPaul's Drag Race UK	Guest judge	Series 4, episode 1
2023	Joanna Lumley's Spice Trail Adventure	Herself/presenter	Documentary series
2024	Eurovision Song Contest 2024	Herself/spokesperson	
2025	Joanna Lumley’s Danube	Herself/presenter	Documentary series
2026	Car S.O.S.	Herself	Series 14 Ep 1: Austin-Healey Sprite
2026	Joanna Lumley's Argentina †	Herself/presenter	Documentary series

=== Theatre ===
- Not Now, Darling – Canterbury, 1969
- Don't Just Lie There Say Something – Garrick Theatre, 1971
- The End of Me Old Cigar – Greenwich Theatre, 1975
- Private Lives – UK tour, 1982
- Noel & Gertie – King's Head, Islington, 1983
- Hedda Gabler – Dundee Rep, 1984
- Blithe Spirit – Vaudeville Theatre, 1986
- An Ideal Husband – Chichester Festival, 1987
- The Cherry Orchard – Dundee Rep, 1988
- The Revengers' Comedies – Strand Theatre, 1991
- Who Shall I Be Tomorrow? – Greenwich Theatre, 1992
- The Letter – Lyric Hammersmith, 1995
- Jack and the Beanstalk – Royal Albert Hall, 1996
- The Cherry Orchard – Sheffield Crucible, 2007
- La Bête – Comedy Theatre and Music Box Theater, New York, 2010
- The Lion in Winter – Theatre Royal Haymarket, 2011
- Joanna Lumley: It's All About Me – UK and Ireland tour, 2018
- Joanna Lumley: Me & My Travels – Australian tour, 2024

=== Radio ===
- Conversations From A Long Marriage – BBC Radio 4 comedy with Roger Allam written by Jan Etherington, 2018–2025
- Hitchhiker's Guide to the Galaxy – Tertiary Phase – BBC Radio 4 comedy written by Douglas Adams, adapted and directed by Dirk Maggs, 2004

=== Bibliography ===
- Peacocks and Commas: Best of the "Spectator" Competitions (1983) – Editor
- Stare Back and Smile: Memoirs (1989) – Memoir
- Forces Sweethearts (1993) – Editor
- Girl Friday (1994)
- In the Kingdom of the Thunder Dragon (1997)
- No Room for Secrets (2005) – Memoir
- Absolutely (2011) – Memoir
- A Queen for All Seasons: A Celebration of Our One and Only Queen Elizabeth II on Her Platinum Jubilee (2021) – Biography

She has also narrated a number of audiobooks and provided forewords for works by other authors.

=== Home media ===
- Joanna Lumley's Nile (2010)
- Joanna Lumley's Trans-Siberian Adventure (2015)
- Joanna Lumley's Japan (2016)
- Joanna Lumley's Silk Road Adventure (2018)
- Joanna Lumley's India (2018)
- Joanna Lumley's Home Sweet Home (2021)
- Joanna Lumley's Spice Trail Adventure (2023)
