= Francis Bird =

English sculptor (1667-1731)

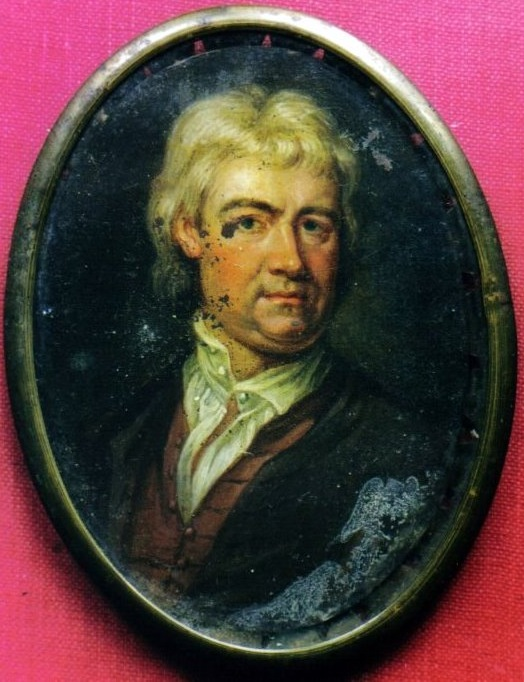
- Francis Bird, miniature, oil on copper
- Born: 1667; London
- Died: 1731 (aged 63–64); London
- Education: Flanders under Cozins, Rome under Le Gros, England under Gibbons and Cibber
- Known for: Sculpture
- Notable work: The Conversion of St Paul, Queen Anne, St Paul's Cathedral, London
- Spouse: Hester Bird

Francis Bird (1667–1731) was one of the leading English sculptors of his time. He is mainly remembered for sculptures in Westminster Abbey and St Paul's Cathedral. He carved a tomb for the dramatist William Congreve in Westminster Abbey and sculptures of the apostles and evangelists on the exterior of St Paul's, a memorial to William Hewer in the interior of St Paul's Church, Clapham as well as the statue of Henry VI in School Yard, Eton College. Despite his success, later in life Bird did little sculpting. He had inherited money from his father-in-law and set up a marble import business.

== Life ==
He was born in the St James's Parish in Westminster in what is now central London in 1667.

At about eleven years old he was sent to Flanders where he studied under the sculptors Jan and Henri Cosyns. He then went on his first trip to Rome to study further, under Le Gros. He returned to London around 1689. He had been so long abroad he found he could hardly speak English. In London he worked under Grinling Gibbons and Caius Gabriel Cibber. After a few years, he went back to Rome for a further nine months where he is documented as an assistant to Pierre Le Gros the Younger in 1697.

== St Paul’s Cathedral, London ==
Bird is best known for his work at St Paul's Cathedral. In March 1706 he was paid £329 for the panel over the west door and in December of that year £650 for carving the "Conversion of St Paul", 64' long and 17' high for the great pediment. This contained "eight large figures” six whereof on horseback and several of them "two and a half feet imbost". In 1711 he carved the statue of Queen Anne with four other figures, which was erected in St Paul's Cathedral yard in 1712. This statue was saved from demolition in December 1886 when it was replaced by the present statue executed by Richard Belt. The original Queen Anne statue is now in St Leonards-on-Sea in the grounds of Holmhurst St Mary. Between 1712 and 1713 he executed the two panels over the west portico for £339, but it was not until 1721 that he carved the statues of various apostles and evangelists (each nearly 12 ft (3.7 m). high) for the west front and south side of the Cathedral. For these he received a total sum of £2,040.

== Other known works ==
- Memorial to Hugh Darrell (1690) in West Wycombe
- Memorial (with bust) to Thomas Shadwell (1692) in Westminster Abbey
- Memorial to Richard Busby (1695) in Westminster Abbey
- Memorial to Mrs Fitzherbert (1699) in Tissington
- Memorial to the Duke of Bedford (1701) in Chenies
- Memorial to Jane daughter of Christopher Wren (1701) in St Paul's Cathedral
- Statue of Henry VIII (1703) At St Bartholonew's Gate, Smithfield, London
- Memorial to the Earl of Huntingdon (1704) in St James' Church in Piccadilly
- Memorial to Sir Orlando Gee (1705) at Isleworth
- Monument to Mrs Eyre (1705) in Salisbury Cathedral
- Statue of Queen Anne (1706) at Kingston-upon-Thames
- Memorial to Robert Killigrew (1707) in Westminster Abbey
- Monument to Rev John Cawley (1709) at Henley-on-Thames
- Monument to Mrs Benson (1710) in St Leonard's Church in Shoreditch
- Memorial to the Duke of Newcastle (1711) in Westminster Abbey
- Memorial to John Ernest Grabe (1711) in Westminster Abbey
- Statue of Queen Anne (1712) at St Paul's Cathedral
- Memorial to Admiral Henry Priestman (1712) in Westminster Abbey
- Memorial to the Earl of Godolphin (1712) in Westminster Abbey
- Memorial to Thomas Sprat, Bishop of Rochester (1713) in Westminster Abbey
- Memorial to John Sharp, Archbishop of York (1714) in York Minster
- Memorial to Anthony Wingfield (1714) at Stonham Aspal in Suffolk
- Memorial to Admiral John Baker (1716) in Westminster Abbey
- Statue of John Radcliffe (1717) at University College, Oxford
- Statue of Henry VI (1719) at Eton College
- Statue of Cardinal Wolsey (1719) at Christ Church, Oxford
- Statue of Queen Mary (1720) at University College, Oxford
- Statue of Lord Clarendon (1721) in the Clarendon Building in Oxford
- Statuary group (1721) in the Clarendon Building in Oxford
- Monument to the Cavendish family (1728) at Bolsover
- Memorial to William Congreve (1729) in Westminster Abbey

== Gallery ==
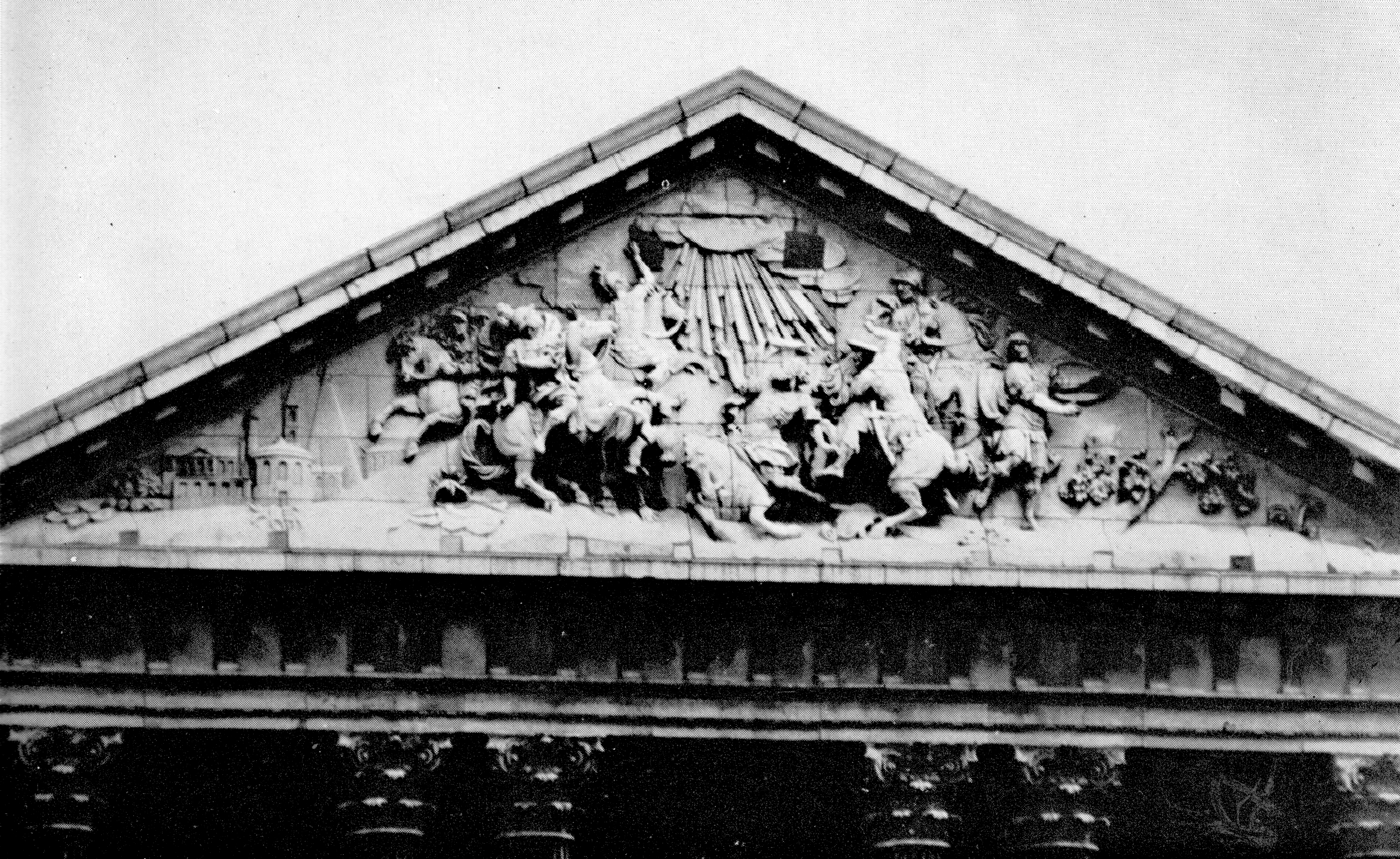
The Conversion of St Paul, 1706, St Paul's Cathedral, London

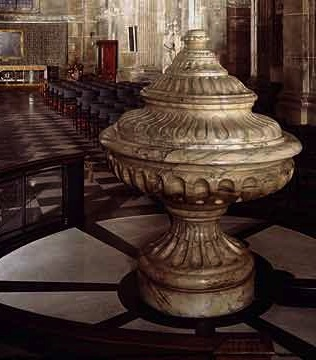
Font, 1727. St Paul's Cathedral, London

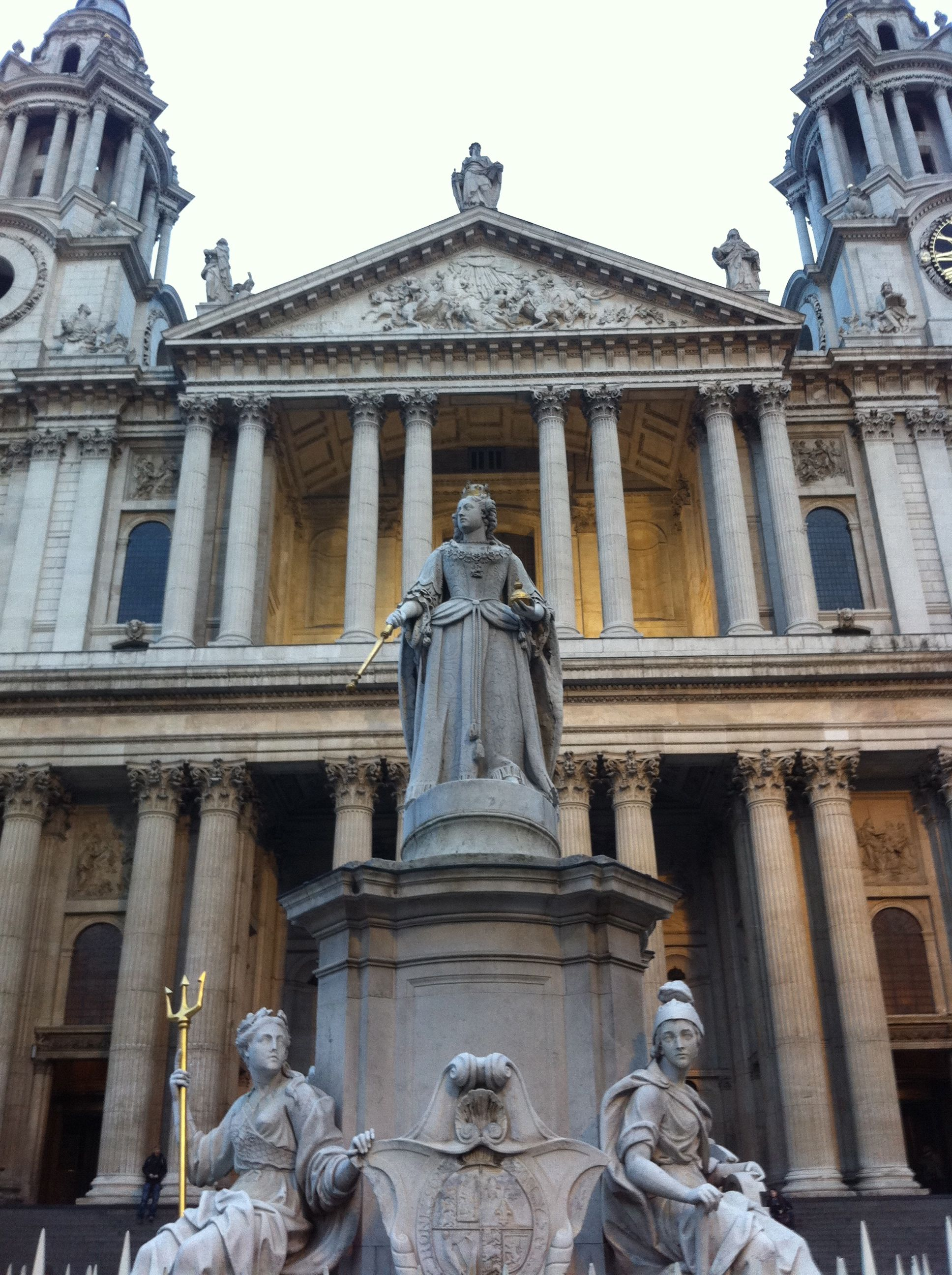
Queen Anne, reproduction of original erected 1712, St Paul's Cathedral, London.

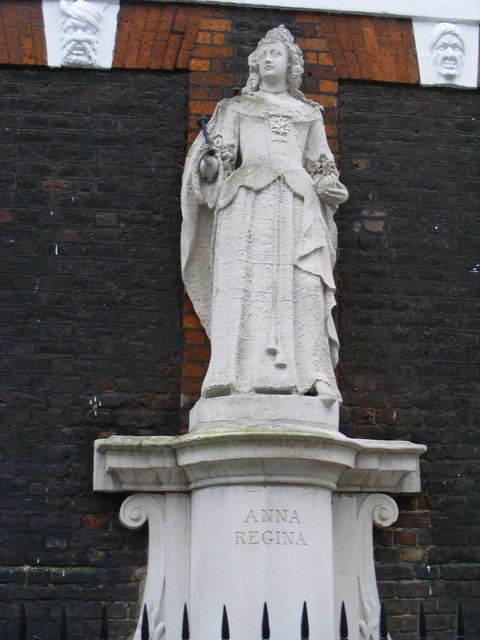
Queen Anne, erected 1708 latest, Queen Anne's Gate, Westminster, London

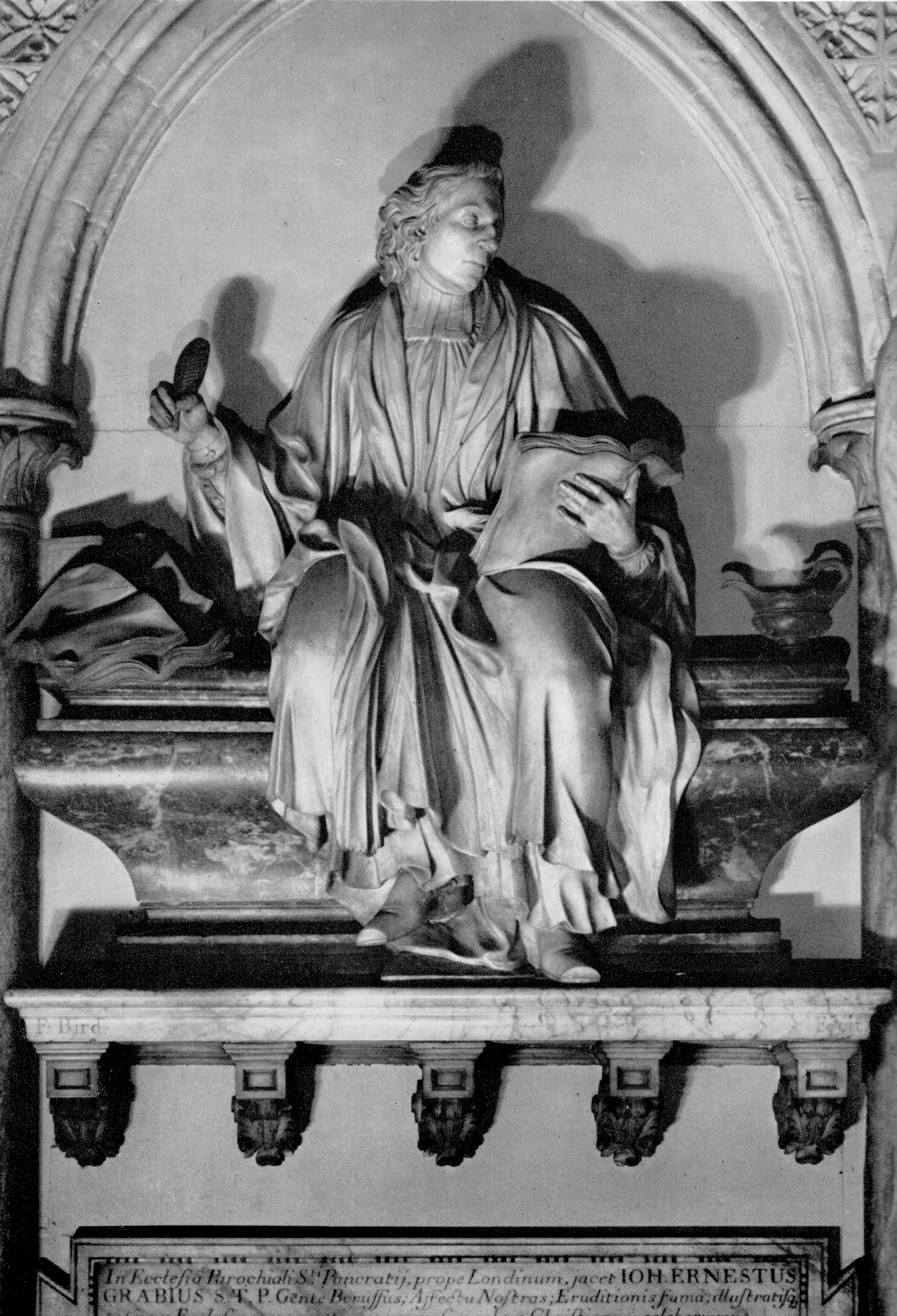
Dr Ernest Grabe, d. 1711. Westminster Abbey, London
