= Jeremiah Hill (merchant) =

British merchant

- Died: 1810; Bristol, England, United Kingdom
- Occupation: Merchant
- Known for: Merchant and landowner linked to the Atlantic slave trade
- Spouse: Maria Partridge

Jeremiah Hill (died 1810) was an English merchant in Bristol and landowner. He was Warden of the Society of Merchant Venturers in 1773, and Master in 1785. Three of his female descendants married into leading Bristol commercial families, Daniel, Miles and Tyndall, linked to the Atlantic slave trade.

== Life ==
Hill was in business with the sons of William Reeve (died 1779), a Bristol Quaker copper smelter and brass founder who was also a slave-trader. They were active in particular in controlling in 1769 a sugar plantation in Trinity Palmetto Point Parish, Saint Kitts, with sugar going to Reeve & Co. in Bristol. The partnership suffered bankruptcy in 1774. A final dividend from this partnership was paid out in 1791.

In 1775 Hill was living at 11 Old Market, Bristol. He had an office at Castle Ditch. He took on in 1779 John Barrow as an apprentice, who was a great-uncle on his mother Elizabeth Dickens's side of Charles Dickens. The firm Jeremiah Hill, Sons & Co. was set up., with Hill having as partners Barrow, Jeremiah Hill junior and Charles Hill, and Robert Vinier. It was dissolved in 1808, by the effluxion of time.

== Down House ==
Jeremiah Hill's residence, Down House, was a Georgian mansion built on the site of the Ostrich Inn, in the Clifton area and outside the limits of the city of Bristol. It was located on Durdham Down, and the Inn during the 18th century had a fashionable cockpit.

== Family ==
Hill married Maria Partridge. She died at Down House in 1820.

His residuary heir was Jeremiah Hill, junior, who married in 1822 Frances Daniel, daughter of Thomas Daniel of Bristol, and had four children. Thomas Daniel transferred a share in the Bristol Institution to him, in 1827. He was High Sheriff of Bristol in 1842. He was the father of the Rev. Charles Gray Hill (1823–1894). His daughter Maria Susannah married in 1853 Charles William Miles, at which time he was living at Henbury. He was a collector of works related to Bristol, including a manuscript by Thomas Chatterton. Frances Hill outlived him by 45 years, residing at Henbury House.

Other sons mentioned in the will were Charles, who had a daughter Caroline Chichester, and Thomas married to Ann, with four children plus two sons born out of wedlock.

The son Charles John Hill (1798–1867) became lieutenant-colonel in the 7th Hussars. He was too young to be the Charles Hill of Hill & Sons, or the Charles Hill of the will. The death registration (Doncaster 1867 Q3, age 69) is for John Charles Hill. He married in 1836 Frances Charlotte Arabella Lumley-Saville, sister of Richard George Lumley, 9th Earl of Scarbrough; what Walford says in 1864 about his being the eldest son appears inconsistent, but the usage might mean "eldest surviving". He died in 1867 at Tickhill Castle. A Charles Hill had had copied (in 1829) and preserved letters of Anne Murray Keith to his father Jeremiah Hill.

Of the daughters:

- A daughter died in 1786.
- Mary Sybella, called the eldest daughter (died 1822 aged 31, so born 1790/1) married in 1812 Thomas Tyndall (1787–1841) of the Fort, grandson of Thomas Tyndall.
- Elizabeth (1792–1883), married in 1824 as his second wife Thomas Grove (1783–1845), and had two daughters. Of the daughters, Mary married Cospatrick Baillie-Hamilton (1817–1892) RN CB.

== Legacy ==
In 1816/7 Christopher Bethell-Codrington purchased estates from Jeremiah Hill junior near Wapley, and in other Gloucester parishes, for £45,000.

Down House was put on the market, with 13 acres (5.3 ha), by Jeremiah Hill junior in 1822. By 1825, it belonged to the barrister Ebenezer Ludlow (1777–1851). He was an agent for Henry Somerset, 6th Duke of Beaufort, a Tory political candidate, and from 1819 Town Clerk of Bristol. In a remote location, its postal address seems to have been moot. In 1824, the diary of Charlotte Grove Downes recorded the marriage of Elizabeth Hill to her brother Thomas as from Almondsbury; and Ludlow in 1844 gave Almondsbury as his seat. The house was on 1870s maps, but later was demolished. At that period, the carriage road that led from it across Durdham Down to the main road was closed and turfed over.
