= Forbes baronets of Monymusk (1626) =

The Forbes baronetcy, of Pitsligo and Monymusk in the County of Aberdeen, was created in the Baronetage of Nova Scotia on 30 March 1626 for William Forbes, with remainder to heirs male whatsoever. He was a descendant of Duncan Forbes, second son of James Forbes, 2nd Lord Forbes (see the Lord Forbes).

The 8th Baronet assumed the additional surname and arms of Hepburn. He was the heir general of the last Lord Forbes of Pitsligo (his ancestor, the 4th Baronet, having married Hon. Mary, daughter of Alexander Forbes, 3rd Lord Forbes of Pitsligo). His only child, Harriet Williamina, married Charles Henry Rolle Trefusis, 20th Baron Clinton. On the Baronet's death in 1828 the Forbes of Pitsligo estates passed to his daughter and son-in-law (see the Baron Clinton). The 7th Baronet married Williamina Wishart, only child and heiress of Sir John Belshes Wishart (later Stuart), 4th Baronet. The 10th Baronet assumed the additional surname of Stuart.

== Forbes, later Stuart-Forbes, of Monymusk (1626) ==
- William Forbes, 1st Baronet (d. c. 1650), son of William Forbes of Monymusk
- William Forbes, 2nd Baronet (d. c. 1680)
- John Forbes, 3rd Baronet (d. c. 1700)
- William Forbes, 4th Baronet (d. c. 1720)
- William Forbes, 5th Baronet (d. 1743)
- William Forbes, 6th Baronet (1739–1806)
- William Forbes, 7th Baronet (1773–1828)
- John Stuart Hepburn Forbes, 8th Baronet (1804–1866)
- William Forbes (1835–1906, nephew of John Stuart Hepburn Forbes and son of Charles Hay Forbes)
- Charles Hay Hepburn Stuart-Forbes (1871–1927)
- Hugh Stuart-Forbes (1896–1937)
- Charles Edward Stuart-Forbes, 12th Baronet (1903–1985)
- William Daniel Stuart-Forbes (1935–2024), died 17 April 2024
- Kenneth Charles Stuart-Forbes (born 1956)

== Coat of arms ==
Coat of arms of Forbes baronets of Monymusk
Crest Out of a baron’s coronet a hand holding a scimitar all proper. Escutcheon Quarterly: 1st and 4th, Azure, on a chevron Argent between three bears' heads, couped of the last, muzzled Gules, a man's heart Proper; 2nd counter-quartered, 1st and 4th, Argent, three bears' heads, couped, muzzled Gules, 2nd and 3rd, Azure, three frases Argent; 3rd, Or, a bend Gules, surmounted by a fess chequy Azure and Argent in chief a crescent of the third. Supporters Two bears proper. Motto Top: Nec timide, nec temere. (Neither timidly, nor rashly); Bottom: Fax mentis honestæ gloria.
