= Anne Mackenzie (writer) =

British writer (1818–1877)

Ann Mackenzie
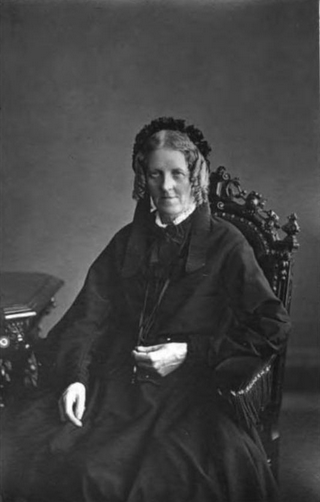
- Anne Mackenzie, 1872
- Born: 13 August 1818; Scotland
- Died: 13 February 1877 (aged 58)
- Citizenship: British
- Occupation: Writer
- Relatives: Colin Mackenzie of Portmore (father); Charles Frederick Mackenzie (brother); William Forbes Mackenzie (brother); Sir William Forbes, 6th Baronet (grandfather)
- Writing career
- Notable works: Mission Life among the Zulu-Kafirs. Memorials of Henrietta Robertson ... Compiled chiefly from letters and journals written to the late Bishop Mackenzie and his sisters. Edited by Anne Mackenzie. [With a map, etc.]., 1866

Anne Mackenzie (13 August 1818 – 13 February 1877) was a 19th-century British writer. She spent some time teaching at mission schools in South Africa before joining the Zambesi Mission of the Universities' Mission to Central Africa, which was led by her brother, Charles. After his death, she returned to England, where she edited the monthly missionary magazine The Net Cast in Many Waters: Sketches from the Life of Missionaries which was published by the Society for the Propagation of the Gospel (SPG) in London, from 1866 to 1896. This had a special interest in missions in Zululand, but also covered other Anglican missions, especially those run by the SPG. Working with and for her brother, first at Durban and then at the Umhlali station, Anne grew more and more into his spirit of self-devotion. The years she spent in assisting his labours among the Nguni and colonists were the happiest of her life, though exhausting.

== Early life and education ==
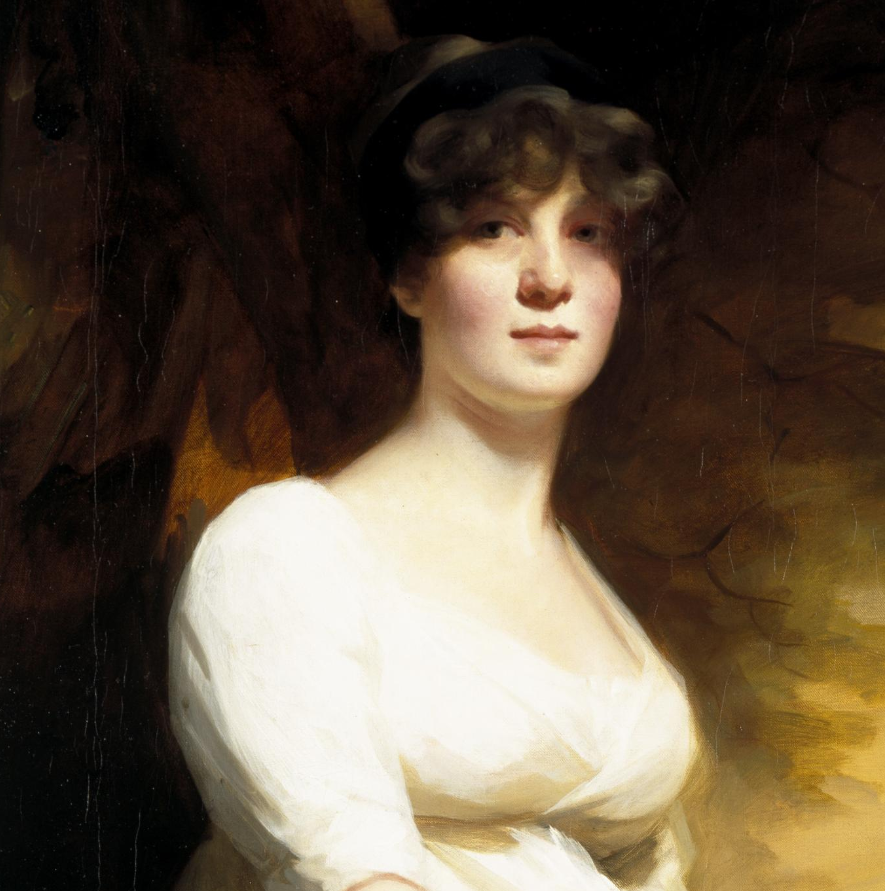
Elizabeth Forbes, Mrs Colin Mackenzie of Portmore

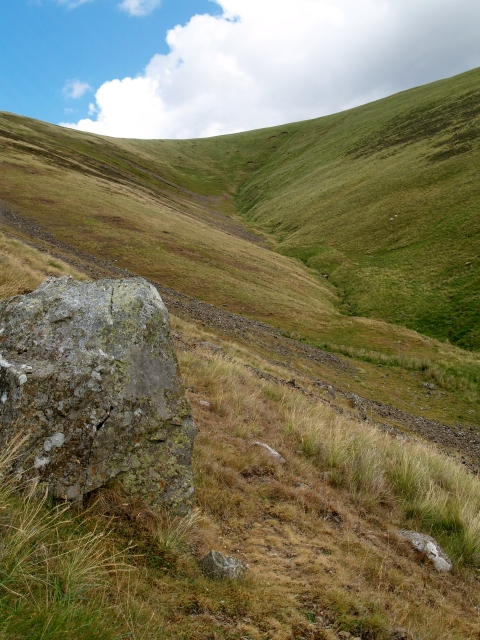
Harcus Burn

Anne Mackenzie was born in Scotland on 13 August 1818. She was one of the large family of Colin Mackenzie of Portmore, a Scottish lawyer, who founded a bank that is now the National Bank of Scotland; and his wife, Elizabeth, the daughter of Sir William Forbes, 6th Baronet. There were many siblings in the family and these included: Alexander (died in infancy), Alexander, William Forbes, Colin, James Hay, John (became Treasurer of the Bank of Scotland), Sutherland, George, Charles, Elizabeth, Katharine, Jane, Louisa, and Alice.

It was a happy, but not a luxurious home. With so large a family, thrift was required, and in the little cottage at Harcus in Peeblesshire, the children were packed closely, and brought up hardily, without bedroom carpets, hot water, or many servants to wait upon them. They always were very kind in their ways, taking interest in their servants, and in the poor around. Decided Episcopalians, they took an active part in the building of a small church near their own home, but in later life, Anne felt that she doubted whether there was much real religion amongst the children.— "I believe it consisted in our thinking ourselves superior to our Presbyterian neighbours".

After the father's death in 1830, the whole family moved to Edinburgh, and lived for years in the same house in one of the quiet parts of the town. Anne was at this time seventeen, and was supposed to be out of school, but she had always a great desire to learn, and out of her own small allowance, she managed to take lessons and attend classes, and to cultivate her love of music by going to concerts.

Mrs. Mackenzie’s death in 1852, left Anne without a settled home. She lived chiefly in lodgings, sometimes at the seaside, sometimes in Edinburgh, with her maid. She was not strong enough to undertake helpful work in the family, as her unmarried sister did, and her only occupation was to read every book that came in her way. She did not seem specially wanted anywhere. Her decided opinions were apt to make her seem over-stern, so that she was not exactly a popular character. Never strong, the Scottish climate was so difficult for Anne in the winter; when in December 1854, her youngest brother, Charles, accepted the Archdeaconry of Pietermaritzburg, he suggested to Anne to go out with him. To be warmly welcomed and to share her brother's home was delightful to Anne, but she did not share her brother's enthusiasm for Mission work, believing that it was a gentleman's profession.

== Career ==
=== Natal ===
On 7 March 1855 the Mission Party of 44 people boarded the barque, Jane Morice, at Liverpool, and the Colony of Natal was sighted on 19 May. The spent a week at Durban before they were ordered off to Pietermaritzburg, the chief town of the Colony and the seat of Government, about 52 miles away. When the Bishop decided that Charles was needed back in Durban, they returned there.

Anne and Charles brought one English maid, Jessie, with them, and had besides three "Kafir" men, one to look after the horses, one to do the house work, and the other to work in the kitchen. Anne was ashamed of the difficulty she had in bearing many things which other women in the Colony took as a matter of course, but she was not a professed missionary; she had come to Natal for her health. At 42, she found herself one of the oldest people in the colony. But after realizing she was at a turning point of her life, she decided against being a "sufferer" and to become a "doer". She took good care of her brother's home, and also found ways to help wherever she could in the many needs of a young Colony. She conquered her shrinking away from African people in general, but her special inclination was for English girls, whom she felt she understood and sympathized with. The school of colonists' children which gathered round her and her brother and sister at the Umhlali station was a great interest as well as exhausting effort.

Charles and Anne became friends with the missionaries, Rev. and Mrs. Robertson. After the Government gave up 500 acres of land on the coast for a Mission Station, about 10 miles (16 km) away, the Robertsons moved there at once. Thereafter, besides their own immediate work, Charles and Anne gave much interest to Ekufundisweni, more commonly known as the Umlazi Station, conducted by the Robertsons on the Umlazi, the details of which were included in The Life of Henrietta Robertson. By January 1857, Charles was no longer the Rector of Durban so until a decision was made as to where he should be settled next, Anne removed to the Umlazi station.

On 1 April Charles shared the news that was to have charge of the Mission Station at the Umhlali, which was hailed as a good change. In June, Charles and Anne were joined by another sister, Alice. The Umhlali station was about 50 miles (80 km) from where the Umlazi station, 40 miles (64 km) on the further side of Durban, and a good deal more to the north. The Umhlali district or parish was a very large one, with several small scattered congregations. The station had to be built up before the sisters could enter upon their part of the work. It stood on a bleak, bare plain, far from wood, water, bush, and hills, with a cold mist and a broiling sun. In spite of this, the place had the merit of being very healthy, and sickness in the camp near it was very rare. The house was not very comfortable, or water-tight. It consisted of a long room used as a church on Sundays, a sitting room, and one or two small veranda rooms in which Anne and the English maid slept, Charles and Alice having separate huts for bedrooms. Charles and his sisters opened a school for European children, of whom there were many nearby, glad to have a chance of being taught. Following a fire at their home, the Mackenzies lived in huts and tents for several months. Anne was very often in bed with a blinding headache, however, she did not excuse herself for that reason. She knew herself to be behind others in warmth and earnestness, and was afraid of doing harm to the "Kafirs" by half or imperfect teaching. Although there was no house for schooling, it was not discontinued and the usual work went on, only under unusual difficulties.

At the beginning of 1858, the Mackenzies moved into Seaforth, their newly built home, which was to be their last in Natal. During Christmas-time, their oldest sister, Elizabeth, died.

=== England ===
In July 1859, Charles and Anne went to England, where he was sent to consult on the extension of Mission work beyond the British frontier. Charles explained to friends that he did not know whether in a few months he should return to his parish at the Umhlali, or be required to head the New Mission in Zululand. He offered his services to the SPG as a Deputation to speak at missionary meetings and for the rest of the year, he worked for the SPG.

During a round of public meetings in England, Anne made many friends. On 2 November 1859 it was decided to offer the Headship of the Central African Mission to Charles, which Dr. David Livingstone had requested in Central Africa. While Anne stayed behind in England, Charles spent the greater part of the year 1860 in traveling the countryside of the new mission to familiarize himself with the almost unexplored area.

=== Cape Town ===
Anne was with Charles at Canterbury Cathedral on 2 October 1860, where he gave a farewell service. The next day, they started for Southampton, and then on to Cape Town with the Mission party, which included two clergymen, Mr. Procter and Mr. Scudamore; Mr. Waller, the Lay Superintendent, who was also something of a doctor; Gamble, a carpenter, and Adams, a labourer. There, Charles was to be consecrated Bishop of the new diocese. Anne knew the life would be something much rougher than anything they had undergone in Natal, but she thought she could bear it. On the voyage, they tried to study the Sechuana language, which it was thought might be useful in the land to which they were going, but it was not satisfactory work as they had no proper books. They knew the chances of its being useful were small as it was not the dialect generally spoken anywhere near the Zambesi River, to which they were going; it was merely a rather well-known African language which any indigenous person of the area might happen to know, just as an Englishman might happen to understand French or German. Alice, who was still working in Natal, would be eager to join the party to the Zambesi, and she was quite prepared to do so, but as neither sister could go there immediately, Alice did not at once leave her work amongst the Kafirs.

The mission party reached Cape Town in the middle of November 1860, and Charles was consecrated as a Bishop on 1 January 1861. At Cape Town, Anne was left as the guest of Bishop Robert Gray, while her brother and the pioneers of the expedition proceeded in HMS Lyra, commanded by Captain R. B. Oldfield.

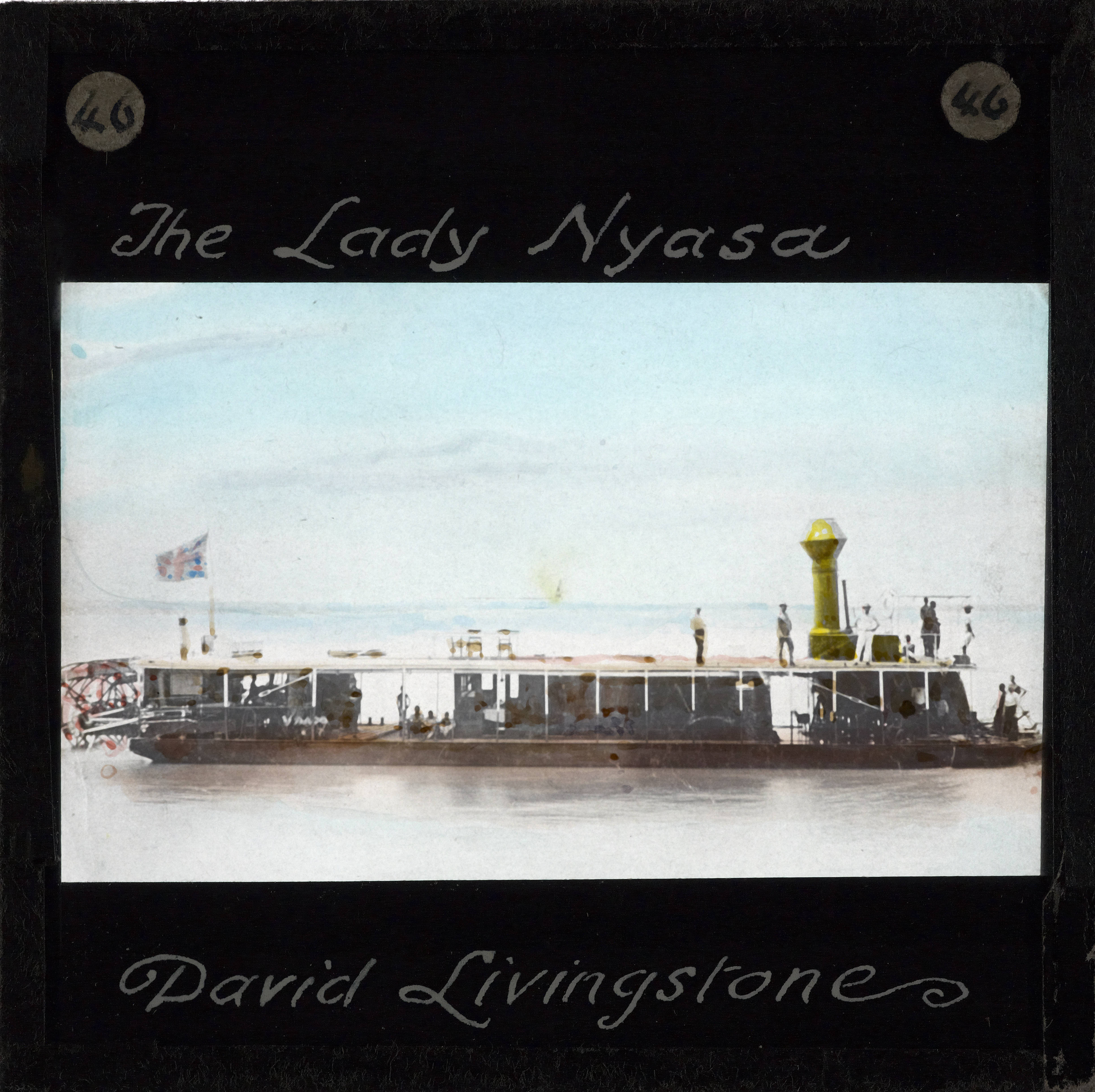
Lady Nyasa

Her brother's departure had overwhelmed Anne for a brief period, but she was not one to give herself up to melancholy or idleness. She was the guest of Bishop Gray, and during the waiting time that had to elapse before her brother could possibly receive her on the Zambesi, she made herself useful in the schools, and interested herself in other branches of the church work going on at the Cape. She had nearly a year to fill up for it was not till December 1861, that she started in the brig, Hetty Ellen, for the Zambesi. Henry de Wint Burrup, one of the clergy of the Mission, had brought his newly married young wife out to the Cape a few months before, and she was to be Anne's companion all the way. Mrs. Livingstone was also of the party, on the way to join her husband at the river mouth; and Jessie, the English servant, who had done so well in Natal, had proved willing to encounter the greater hardships of Central Africa, and was with her mistress. Anne knew she should not be able to walk, and the terrible tsetse fly kills all the horses who venture in that area; but she provided herself with a donkey called "Katie", and that too was on board the small, crowded brig. Another reason for the crowding on board was that the Hetty Ellen was bringing out a small paddle steamer called the Lady Nyassa, in which it was hoped Dr. Livingstone would be able to get further up the rivers than was possible in the Pioneer.

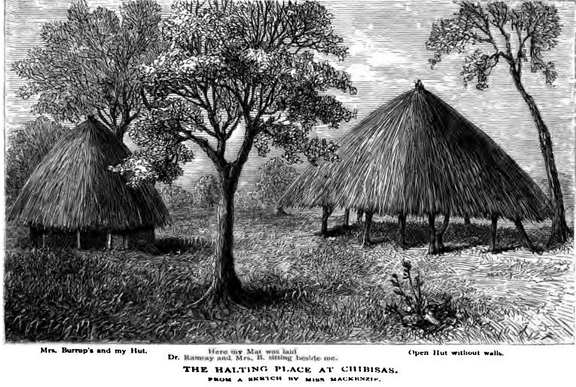
The halting place at Chibisas of Anne Mackenzie and Elizabeth Mary Tudway Burrup (Feb 1862)

About a month after leaving the Cape, they encountered very bad weather and an uncomfortable voyage on the Hetty Ellen, which was in poor shape. They reached the river mouth on 8 January 1862 and Mozambique on 21 January. Here, they fell in with HMS Gorgon, commanded by Captain Wilson. He took Anne and Mrs. Burrup on board his own vessel, and with the Hetty Ellen in tow, they sailed for Kongone, a primary distributary of the Lower Zambezi, on 22 January. With the sea quieter in the next stretch, Anne and Mrs. Burrup began making a cane seat, and Anne began to copy a manuscript vocabulary of Mozambique words. Wilson took them to the mouth of the river where, according to appointment, the Bishop and Mr. Burrup were to have met them in the Pioneer, with Livingstone, and have taken them up the river to the station at Magomero. But on 31 January only Livingstone was there, and he explained the position of the Mission party as far as he knew it. On 9 February Anne and her companions moved on board the Pioneer before Anne and Mrs. Burrup removed to Captain Wilson's gig. On 17 February they started on their way in an open boat. By the time they reached the appointed rendezvous with Charles, Anne was unconscious of it, so ill was she with fever. Tormented with mosquitoes and suffering from intermittent fever, they reached the landing place only to learn of the death of both the Bishop and Mr. Burrup, the former on Malo Island, which they had passed on the way, at the confluence of the Ruo and the Shire. Anne stayed behind at Chibisas, too feeble to accompany those who went to visit Charles' grave and mark it with a cross of reeds. Thereafter, her life was like a widowhood. Anne and the others left Chibisas on the Pioneer, and on 2 April they transferred to the Gorgon before landing at Cape Town at the end of the month.

=== The Net ===
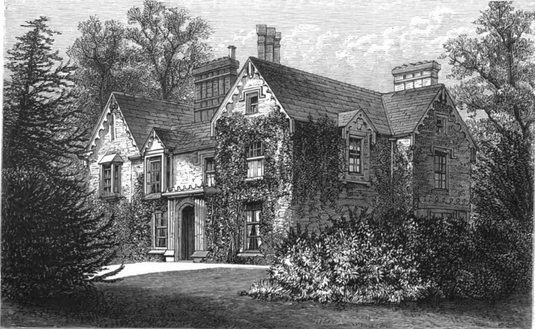
Woodfield, Anne Mackenzie's home in Havant

When she reached Cape Town, she was received and nursed by Bishop Gray and his wife. At first, Anne wanted to linger there, but the Bishop advised her to return home, at least for a time, and resume her life. Though physically frail, she arrived at her brother’s house in Edinburgh, still suffering from African fever, and so weak that she could not be taken upstairs. Gradually recovering some of her health, Anne found the cold of a Scottish winter as too difficult for her, so she fixed her home at Havant, in the south of Hampshire, and spent most of her summers visiting friends, always, however, suffering severely from cold, fatigue, or excitement.

It was her objective to do honour to her brother’s memory in the way he would have preferred, so when his successor, Bishop William Tozer, pronounced the Zambesi Mission impracticable, and removed to Zanzibar, she devoted herself the more to further the work of Mr. and Mrs. Robertson, who, in 1860, broke new ground, beginning a Mission in independent Zululand beyond the Tugela. This had been a field which both Bishop Gray and her brother had always thought the most promising, and the best mode of reaching Central Africa, and she set herself to make it the memorial to her brother, as the Mackenzie Mission.

Her first task was to find fellow-workers, and send out all necessities and comforts that she could procure. The letters from the station at Kwamagwaza, copied and lent about, described their own story, and wherever Anne went, she found a way to awaken a keen interest in her friends. Mr. and Mrs. John Keble in particular gave largely towards building the Mission Church, and also gave a wagon for African traveling. In the midst of these efforts came the news of Mrs. Robertson’s death by an accident involving a wagon. This led to Anne collecting the letters written at the Umlazi and at Kwamagwaza into a memoir, Life of Henrietta Robertson, giving the best insight into the ups and downs of missionary work by the wife of the chaplain of the garrison of Fort-Etchowe, and of the Kafir character.

The book excited a strong interest in the Mission, and the hope that this might not die out led to Anne becoming the editor of a small missionary periodical called The Net, Cast in Many Waters; Sketches from the Life of Missionaries, or simply The Net, which would tell of the work going on there and elsewhere. From the Cape, Melanesia, Honolulu, India, and Madagascar, she could obtain simple and interesting letters, and through The Net, she both asked for and obtained money for Mission purposes. From 1866 to 1896, Anne served as the editor of The Net and its collections. It was published in London by the SPG. Different friends undertook to receive subscriptions for special purposes, or else work, books, and articles of church furniture. Patterns of the kind of clothing required were supplied, and hints of what was needed for colonial pupils or natives, or the missionary’s own family. After The Net had existed for a year, her weak health, made it doubtful for some time as to whether the magazine could be carried on. For several years, a young nephew, who was like herself too delicate to live in Scotland, shared her home, and to some slight extent, her work.

The collection for the Mackenzie Mission at length was sufficient for the foundation of a Bishopric, a work almost without example to have been accomplished by a single and not richly-endowed woman in feeble health. Her personal experience enabled her to perceive the best modes of helping missionaries, not only in their work, but their personal needs —- of education for their children, books, papers, all that could improve lives often hard and lonely. Her packages were very welcome. To one place, she sent an altar cloth; to the Melanesian deacon, a watch; to Cape Town, bits of dress to be bought by colonists’ wives; to India, various articles for Christmas trees; to a missionary’s wife, baby clothes; to another, presents for the chiefs. To some, she became counselor or the means of obtaining counsel on matters of church discipline and doctrine, while to outgoing clergy or sisters, she was a sympathizing adviser, able to prepare them for unsuspected stumbling-blocks or to inspire them by the example of her own devotion.

One year, when spending the winter in Rome, she offered her services to the English Chaplain, and he gathered around her a class of the children of Englishmen employed there who were out of reach of religious instruction. Wherever she was staying in England, she liked to have a Sunday school class. She would give them their religious lesson, and then bring out her photographs and tell them of Natal and the Kafirs. So her life continued till fifteen years had passed without "Charlie".

== Later life and death ==
In the last years of her life, Anne had to make what was perhaps the most difficult effort of her life of self-devotion, that of resigning herself to see the Zululand work not prospering according to her desires, and her friend Mr. Robertson not accepting the Bishopric. In early 1877, she was often ill, with days of restless uneasiness, pain, and discomfort. On 11 February she spoke the last connected words. She died on 13 February 1877.

== Selected works ==
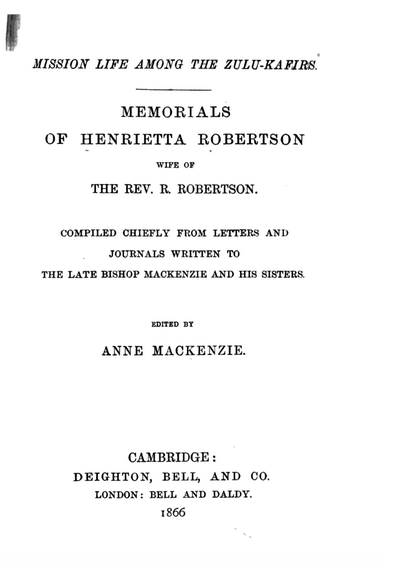
Mission Life among the Zulu-Kafirs. Memorials of Henrietta Robertson

- Mission Life among the Zulu-Kafirs. Memorials of Henrietta Robertson ... Compiled chiefly from letters and journals written to the late Bishop Mackenzie and his sisters. Edited by Anne Mackenzie. With a map, etc., 1866

== See also ==
- All Souls Church, Umhlali
