= Forbes baronets of Craigievar (1630) =

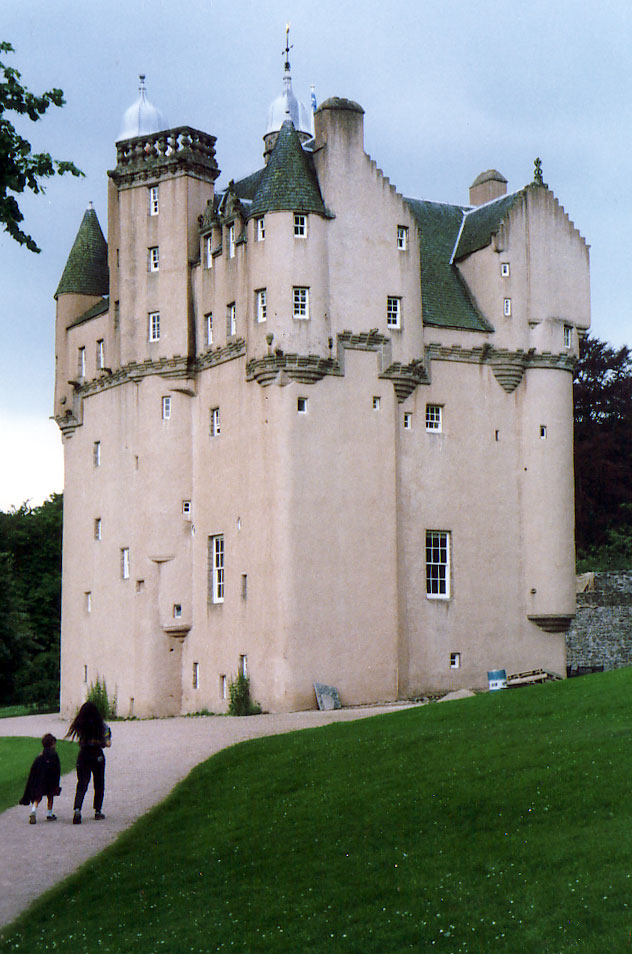
Craigievar Castle

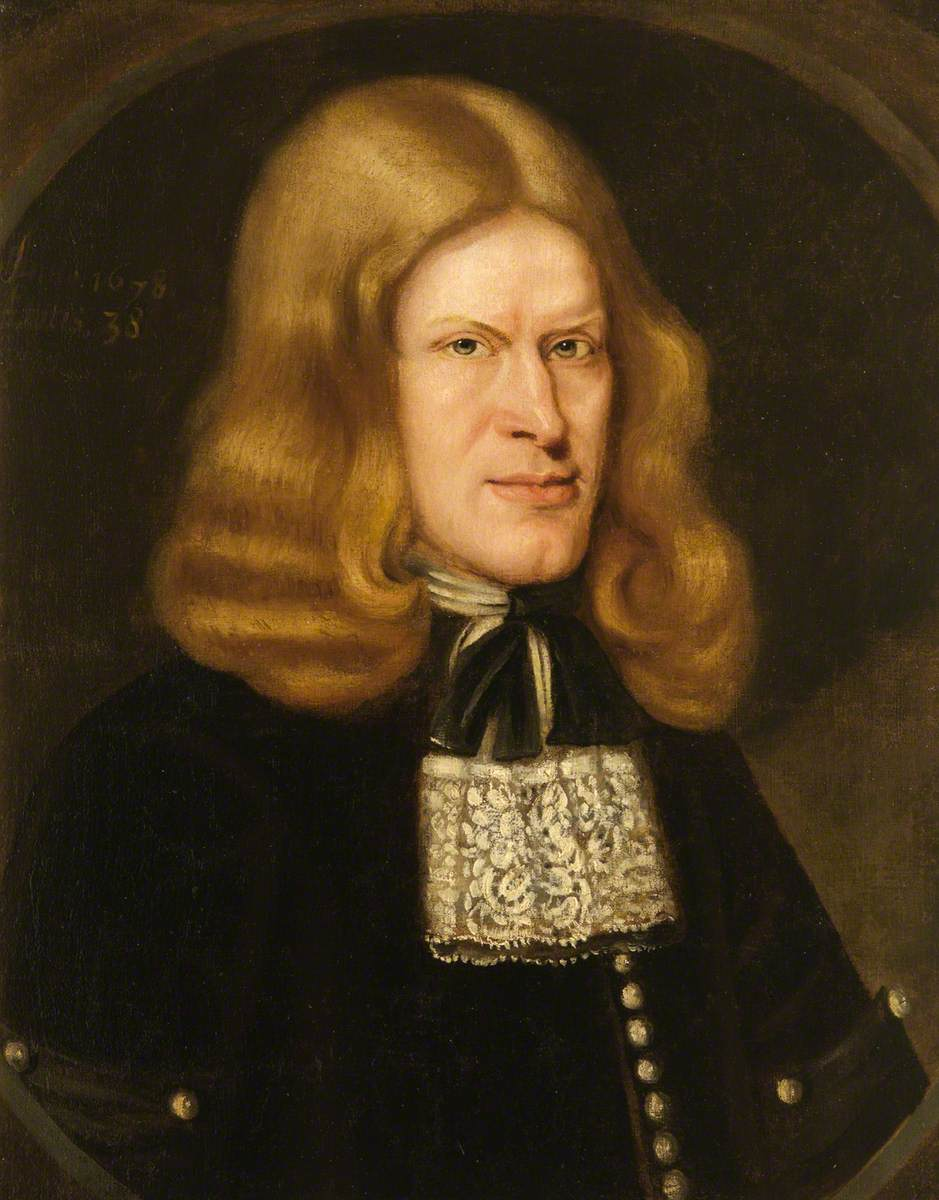
Portrait of Sir John Forbes, 2nd Baronet of Craigievar

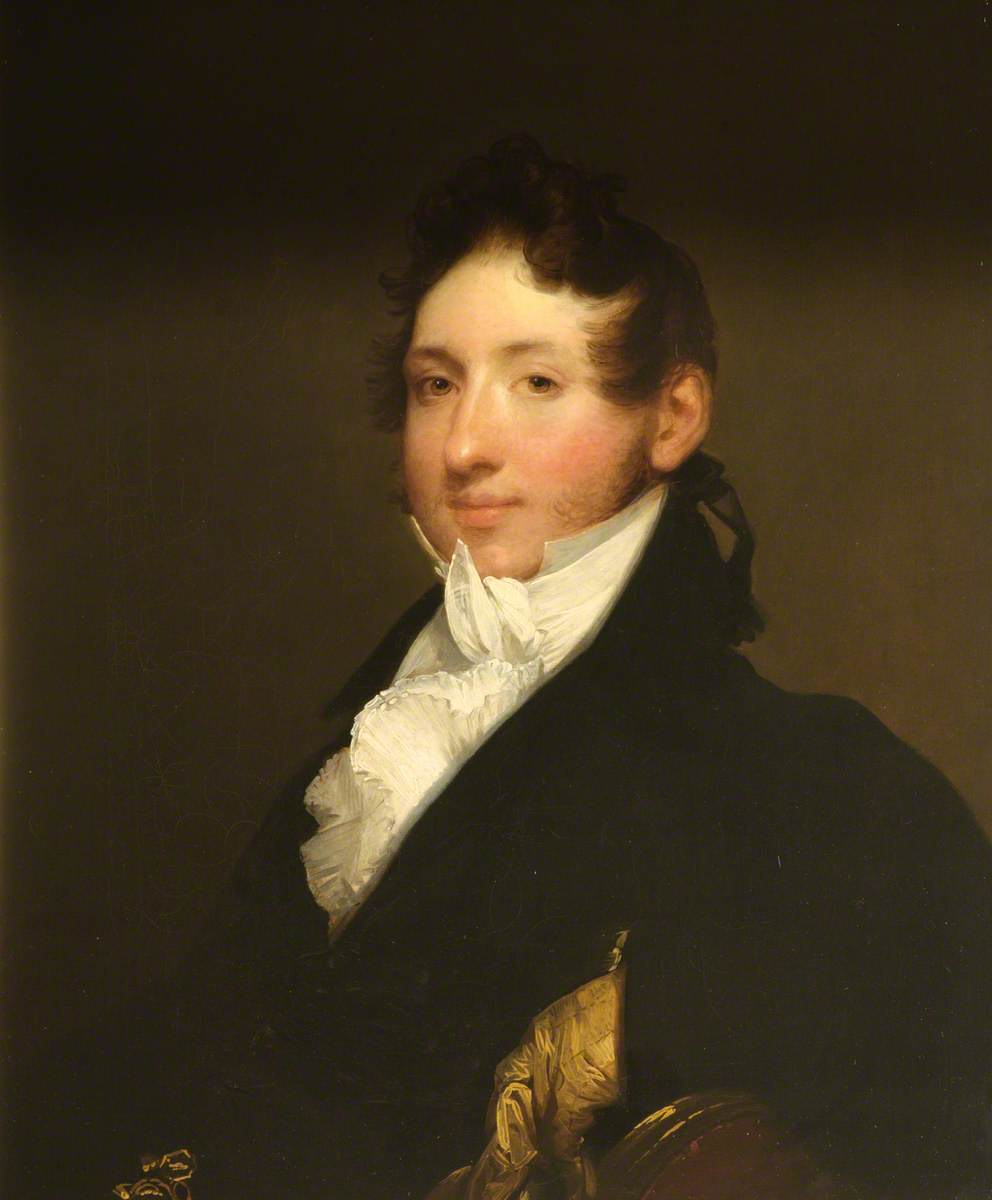
Sir Arthur Forbes (1784–1823), 6th Bt of Craigievar, painted by Gilbert Stuart

The Forbes baronetcy, of Craigievar in the County of Aberdeen, was created in the Baronetage of Nova Scotia on 20 April 1630 for William Forbes, son of the merchant William Forbes who built Craigievar Castle. He was also a descendant of Hon. Patrick Forbes, third son of the 2nd Lord Forbes, and the nephew of the 1st Baronet of the 1628 creation.

The 4th Baronet represented Aberdeenshire in the House of Commons. The 5th Baronet married the Hon. Sarah Sempill, eldest daughter of Hugh Sempill, 12th Lord Sempill. Their grandson, the 8th Baronet, succeeded as 17th Lord Sempill in 1884 (see Lord Sempill for earlier history of this title). The titles remained united until the death of his grandson, the 19th Lord and 10th Baronet, in 1965.

== Separation of titles ==
As the 10th Baronet only had female issue, the barony and the baronetcy had to be separated. He was succeeded in the lordship by his daughter (see Lord Sempill for later history of this title) but the baronetcy had to pass to a male successor. His youngest sibling, a trans man, had changed legal gender from female to male by petitioning the Sheriff of Aberdeen in 1952, becoming Ewan Forbes-Sempill, and assumed the right of succession. A male cousin challenged Ewan's right to the title, but after a two-year legal dispute he succeeded as Sir Ewan Forbes, 11th Baronet (the Sempill surname was dropped on his request). On his death in 1991 the title was then inherited by his cousin Sir John Alexander Cumnock Forbes, 12th Baronet, who had challenged the legality of the succession.

On the death of the 12th baronet in 2000, the baronetcy was inherited by a kinsman, Andrew Iain Ochoncar Forbes (1945), the only son of Lieutenant Colonel Patrick Walter Forbes OBE, elder son of Lieutenant Colonel James Ochoncar Forbes, younger son of James Ochoncar Forbes, younger brother of the 8th baronet and 17th Lord Semphill. However, the baronetcy is on the dormant list of the Standing Council of the Baronetage, as the 13th baronet has not yet established his claim to the title. In 1984 the 13th baronet married Jane Elizabeth Dunbar-Nasmith, a daughter of Rear-Admiral David Dunbar-Nasmith, and they had two sons, James and David Forbes, and two daughters, Isabel and Anna Elizabeth Abercrombie Forbes.

== Forbes baronets, of Craigievar (1630) ==
- Sir William Forbes, 1st Baronet (died 1648)
- Sir John Forbes, 2nd Baronet (1636–1703)
- Sir William Forbes, 3rd Baronet (1660–c.1730)
- Sir Arthur Forbes, 4th Baronet (1709–1773)
- Sir William Forbes, 5th Baronet (1755–1816)
- Sir Arthur Forbes, 6th Baronet (1784–1823)
- Sir John Forbes, 7th Baronet (1785–1846)
- William Forbes, 17th Lord Sempill, 8th Baronet (1836–1905) (succeeded as 17th Lord Sempill in 1884)
- John Forbes-Sempill, 18th Lord Sempill, 9th Baronet (1863–1934)
- William Francis Forbes-Sempill, 19th Lord Sempill, 10th Baronet (1893–1965)
- Sir Ewan Forbes, 11th Baronet (1912–1991)
- Sir John Forbes, 12th Baronet (1927–2000)
- Sir Andrew Forbes, 13th Baronet (1945–2023)
- Sir James Patrick Ochoncar Forbes, 14th Baronet (born 1986)

The heir presumptive is David Ian Ochoncar Forbes (born 1993), younger brother of the present holder.

== Coat of arms ==
Coat of arms of Forbes baronets of Craigievar
Crest A cock proper. Escutcheon Azure, a cross patée fitchee or between three bear’s heads couped argent, muzzled gules. Supporters Dexter: A knight in armour of the fifteenth century, armed at all points, leaving the beaver of his helmet up and leaning on a shield or, charged with a lion rampant gules armed and langued azure within a double tressure flowered and counterflowered with fleurs-de-lis of the second; Sinister, a bear argent, muzzled gules. Motto Watch
