= Sir William Forbes, 6th Baronet =

Scottish banker (1739 - 1806)

Sir William Forbes
- Born: April 1739
- Died: 12 November 1806 (aged 67)
- Occupation: Philanthropist

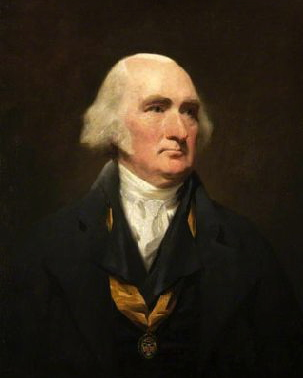
Sir William Forbes by Joshua Reynolds

Sir William Forbes, 6th Baronet FRSE (7 April 1739 – 12 November 1806), also known as William Forbes of Pitsligo, was a Scottish banker, landlord, philanthropist and writer.

== Life and career ==
He was born in Edinburgh on 5 April 1739. His father William Forbes, heir to a Nova Scotia baronetcy, was an advocate; the family estate at Monymusk in Aberdeenshire had been sold by his grandfather. Forbes's maternal grandmother was a sister of Alexander Forbes, 4th Lord Forbes of Pitsligo, whose activities in 1745 led to the forfeiture of his estate, also in Aberdeenshire. His mother, Christian Forbes, was a member of a collateral branch of the Monymusk family, and was left a widow when William, the elder of two surviving boys from a family of five, was only four years old. She settled in Aberdeen in 1745 for the education of her children, who were brought up as Scottish episcopalians. The younger boy died in 1749, and in October 1753 Lady Forbes, with her surviving son, settled in Edinburgh.

A friend of the family, Sir Francis Farquharson of Haughton, arranged with Messrs. Coutts, a prominent firm of bankers in Edinburgh, to admit Forbes as an apprentice, and he entered their service in 1754. It was run by the sons of John Coutts. The apprenticeship lasted four years, and then he was clerk in the counting-house for two years more, at the end of which he was given a small share in the business as a partner.

In 1761 John Coutts, the principal partner of the Edinburgh firm, died, leaving none of the sons of John Coutts the elder in a position to run it. A new partnership, including Forbes, was proposed and established in 1763. After seven years (in 1770) he married Elizabeth Hay, eldest daughter of Sir James Hay of Smithfield, Bt. His mother died in 1789.

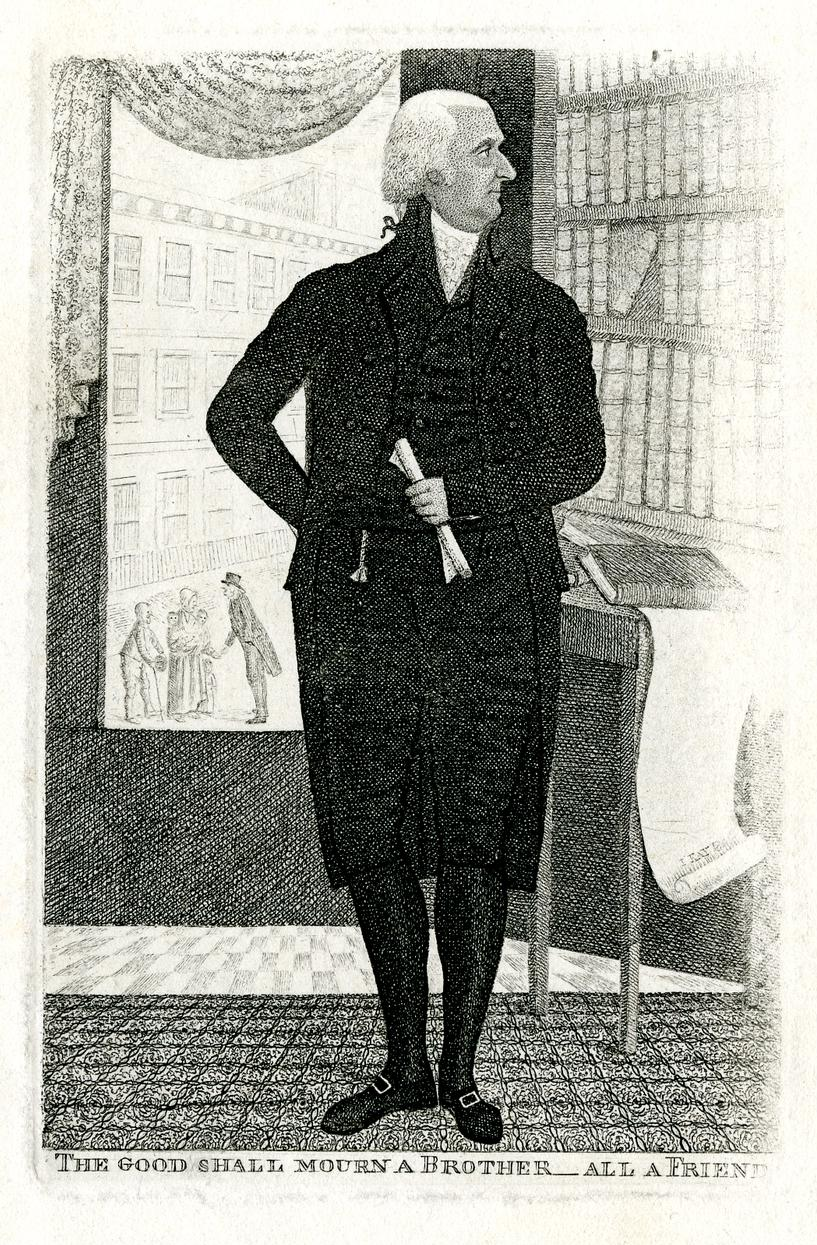
Late Sir Will.m Forbes Bar.t - print made by John Kay (1806)

From 1763 to 1773 the active members of the firm, still under the original name, were Sir Robert Herries, Forbes, and James Hunter. The name Coutts was retained till 1773, when a new contract was made, and the firm became Forbes, Hunter, & Co., Sir William Herries having settled in London to conduct in St James's Street the business later known as Herries & Co. Forbes was now the head of the firm, and decided to confine the transactions of the house to banking alone. The house became one of the most trusted in Scotland, and remained stable in the financial crises and panics of 1772, 1788, and 1793. In 1783 the firm, after difficult preliminaries, began to issue notes.

Forbes had become an authority on finance, and in 1783 he took part in preparing the revised Bankruptcy Act. William Pitt used to consult him, and adopted in 1790 some of his suggestions on the stamps on bills of exchange. In 1799 Pitt offered him an Irish peerage, which he declined. The company in 1838 became the Union Bank of Scotland.

Forbes worked to win back some of the alienated possessions of his ancestors. Lord Pitsligo's only son, the Hon. John Forbes, had bought Pitsligo. William Forbes bought some of the upper barony (the lower barony had passed by purchase to a stranger), and on the death of John Forbes he succeeded in 1781 to the whole. He improved the estate and laid out the village of New Pitsligo in 1783. In that year he was one of the co-founders of the Royal Society of Edinburgh. Forbes was also involved in philanthropic projects in Edinburgh: the High School, the Merchant Company, the Morningside Lunatic Asylum, and the Blind Asylum. Forbes and his business partner Hunter Blair supported the construction of the South Bridge. He also succeeded in giving the Scottish episcopalians a surer standing in Edinburgh. Archibald Alison was brought to the city at his suggestion, and in Alison's works there is a funeral sermon to his memory.

His Edinburgh property was Clam Shell Land on the Royal Mile (still marked with a carved clam shell but no longer known by this name) until around 1770 when he moved to a new property in the New Town, Edinburgh. Many of the partners of the firm where Forbes worked were involved in the Atlantic slave trade.

In March 1792 he was elected Rector of Marischal College, Aberdeen on the death of the incumbent rector, Sir William Fordyce. He retained this position until 1794 when he was succeeded by James Ferguson MP.

In 1801 he commissioned Edinburgh architect Richard Crichton to build a new mansion, Colinton House, in the grounds of Old Colinton House (which was left to become ruinous), all of which he had purchased from the Foulis family. The property passed to the son William on his death, and is now the main building of Merchiston Castle School.

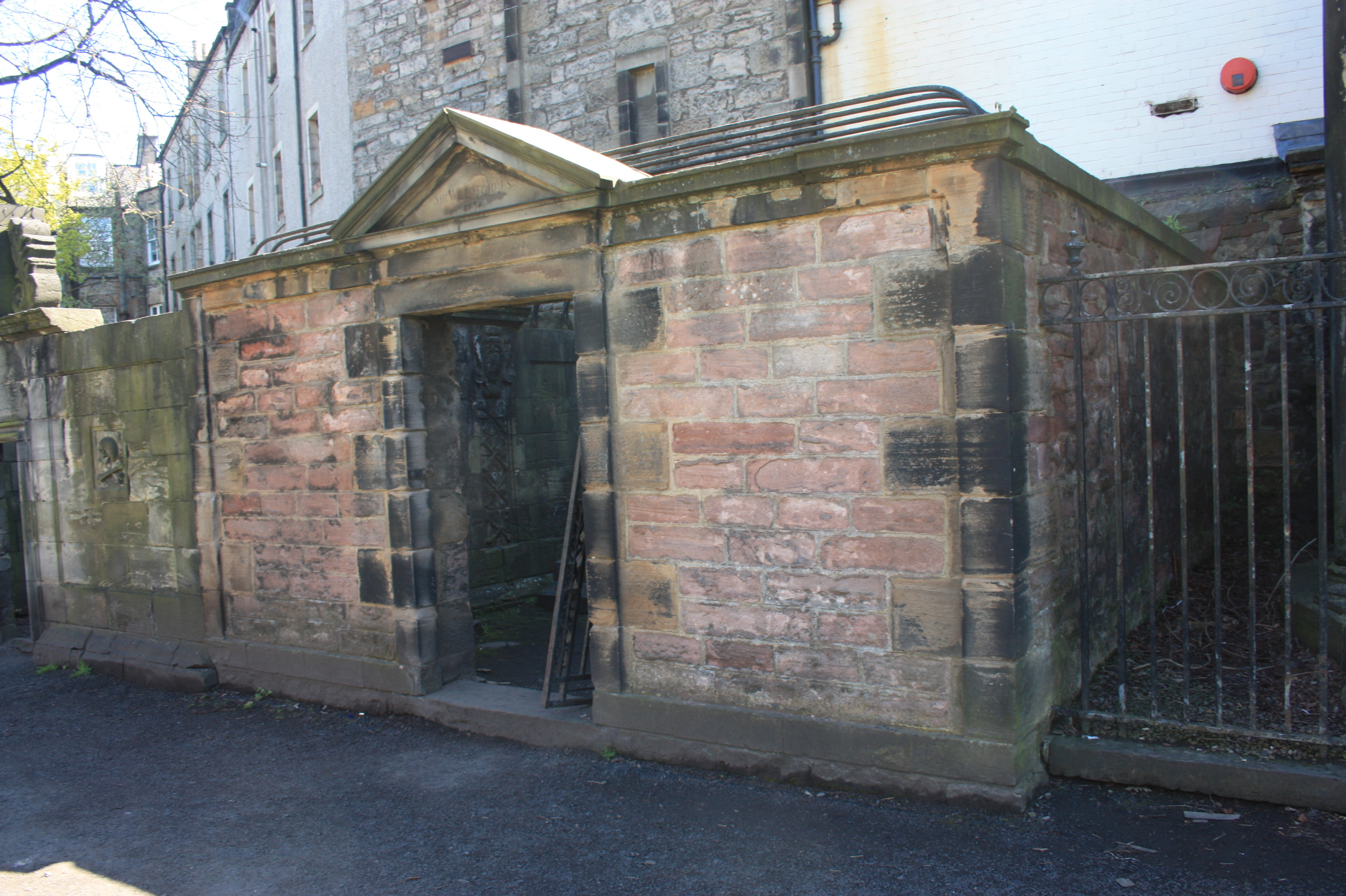
The grave of Sir William Forbes of Pitsligo, Greyfriars Kirkyard

Forbes declined invitations to stand for parliament. He was a member of Samuel Johnson's literary dining club, and he is mentioned in James Boswell's Tour to the Hebrides. Lady Forbes, with whom he made his only lengthy visit to the continent in 1792–3, died in 1802. He died at 39 George Street in Edinburgh on 12 November 1806. He is buried in Greyfriars Kirkyard in the vault immediately east of MacKenzie's domed tomb on the south side. The vault was built at the height of the graverobbing fears in Edinburgh and demonstrates the design art of "secure burial".

== Works ==
His long friendship with the poet James Beattie enabled him to produce An Account of the Life and Writings of James Beattie, LL.D., including many of his Original Letters. This appeared in two quarto volumes in 1806, and was republished in three octavo volumes the following year. Forbes had written before this the tribute to his mother, which remained in manuscript till 1875, another portion of the same manuscript, not hitherto printed, being devoted to the memory of his wife. In the Narrative of the last Sickness and Death of Dame Christian Forbes, 1875, Forbes paid tribute to his mother.

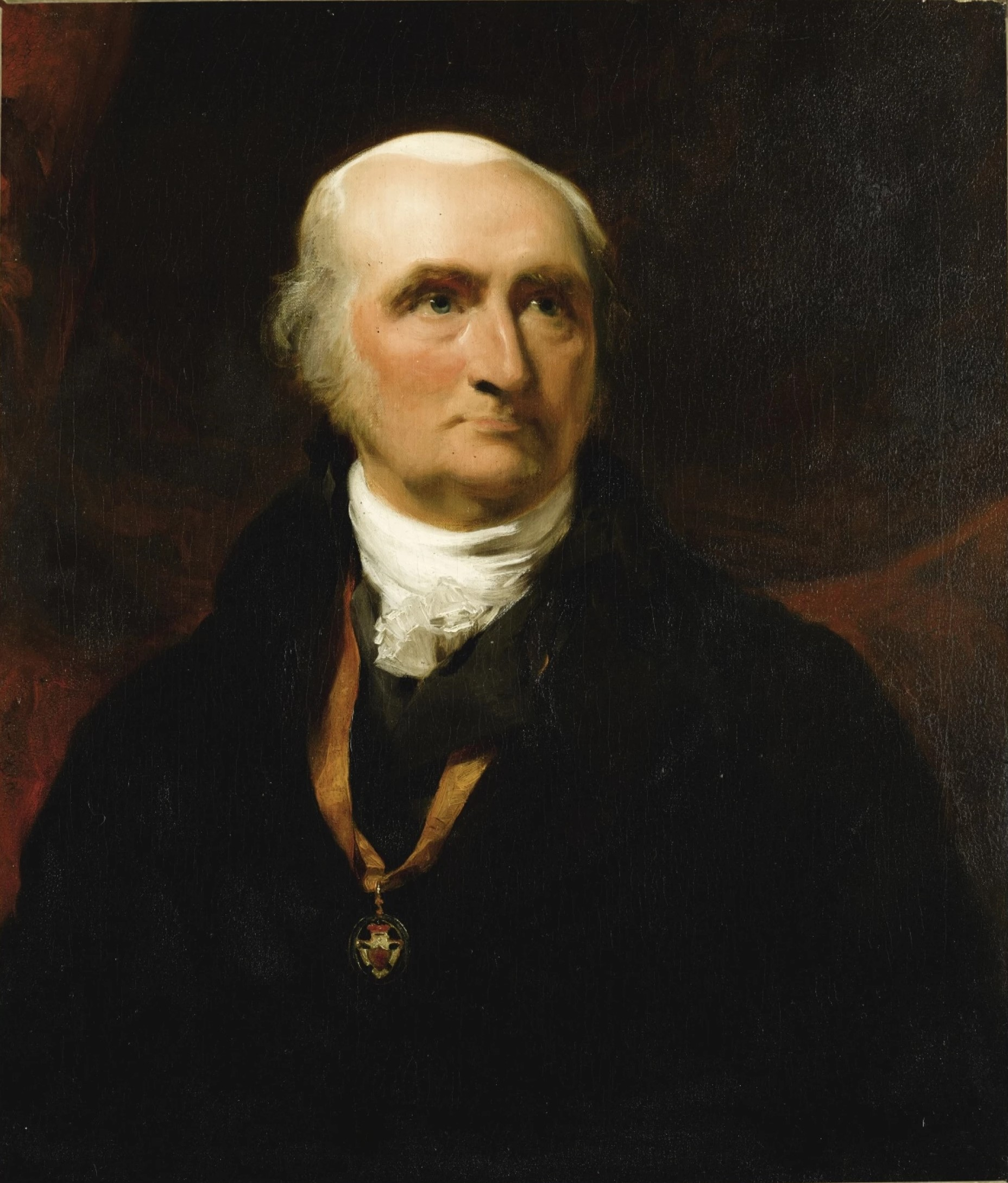
Sir William Forbes of Pitsligo, 6th Bt. by Thomas Lawrence (1803)

He was also author of Memoirs of a Banking-House in 1803.

== Children ==
On 20 September 1770 Forbes married Elizabeth Hay (died 26 December 1789), daughter of Sir James Hay of Haystoun, 4th Baronet of Smithfield, and Dorriel Campbell. Miss Hay was a noted singer with the Edinburgh Music Society based in St Cecilia's Hall.

They had thirteen children:

1. William Forbes of Pitsligo, 7th Baronet Forbes of Monymusk (21 December 1773 – 10 October 1828)
2. Christian Forbes, daughter, (6 June 1775 – 1863), who married Sir Alexander Wood
3. John Hay Forbes, Lord Medwyn (19 September 1776 – 25 July 1854)
4. James Forbes (9 April 1778)
5. Rebecca Forbes, daughter, (24 Dec. 1779–1826) who married Alexander Ranaldson MacDonell of Glengarry
6. Elizabeth Forbes, daughter, (2 March 1781 – 1840), who married Colin Mackenzie of Portmore WS FRSE. Elizabeth was a great beauty and was painted by Sir Henry Raeburn
7. Daniel Forbes (7 August 1782)
8. Adam Forbes (7 September 1783)
9. Grace Forbes, daughter, (23 March 1785)
10. Jane Forbes, daughter, (10 June 1787–24 Nov. 1862) who married, 11 September 1806, James Skene of Rubislaw. Parents to William Forbes Skene
11. Frances Farquharson Forbes, daughter, (10 August 1788)
12. George Forbes (5 September 1790 – 26 September 1857), banker
13. Charles Forbes (23 November 1791)

His grandchildren include James David Forbes and Sir John Stuart Hepburn Forbes and famous great-grandchildren include George Forbes.

== Coat of arms ==
Coat of arms of Sir William Forbes, 6th Baronet
Crest Out of a baron’s coronet a hand holding a scimitar all proper. Escutcheon Quarterly: 1st and 4th, grand quarters, azure, on a chevron between three bears’ heads couped argent, muzzled gules, a heart of the last; 2nd and 3rd, grand quarters, quarterly, 1st and 4th, azure, three bears’ heads couped argent, muzzled gules; 2nd and 3rd, azure, three cinquefoils argent. Supporters Two bears proper. Motto Top: Nec timide, nec temere. (Neither timidly, nor rashly); Bottom: Adversis major par secundis. (Greater than adversity, a match for prosperity)

Masonic offices
Preceded by David Dalrymple	Grand Master of the Grand Lodge of Scotland; 1776–1778	Succeeded by The Duke of Atholl
Baronetage of Nova Scotia
Preceded by William Forbes	Baronet (of Monymusk); 1743–1806	Succeeded by William Forbes
