= Charles Mackenzie (bishop) =

English Anglican bishop (1825–1862)

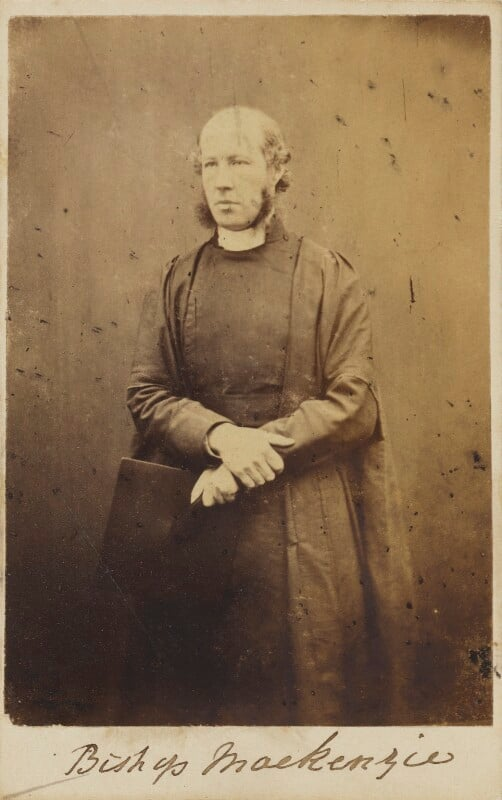
- Mackenzie in 1861

Bishop
- Born: 10 April 1825; Portmore, Peeblesshire, Scotland
- Died: 31 January 1862 (aged 36); Africa
- Venerated in: Anglican Communion
- Feast: 31 January

Charles Frederick Mackenzie (10 April 1825 – 31 January 1862) was a Church of England Bishop of Central Africa. He is commemorated in some Anglican Church calendars.

== Life ==
He was born on 10 April 1825 at Portmore, Peeblesshire, Scotland, the ninth son of Colin Mackenzie and Elizabeth Forbes. Anne Mackenzie, editor of all 31 years of The Net Cast in Many Waters: Sketches from the Life of Missionaries, London, 1866–1896, was his unmarried sister. He was educated at Bishop Wearmouth school and Edinburgh Academy and entered St John's College, Cambridge in 1844. He migrated to Caius College, where he graduated B. A. as Second Wrangler in 1848, and became a Fellow of Caius.

He was ordained as a priest in 1852 and served as curate of Haslingfield near Cambridge, 1851–4. In 1855, he went to Natal with Bishop John Colenso and served as Archdeacon of Natal. They worked among the English settlers till 1859 when he returned to England briefly to raise support for more direct missionary work. In 1860, Mackenzie became head of the Universities' Mission to Central Africa and he was consecrated bishop in St George's Cathedral, Cape Town, on 1 January 1861. Following David Livingstone's request to Cambridge, Mackenzie took on the position of being the first missionary bishop in Nyasaland (now Malawi).

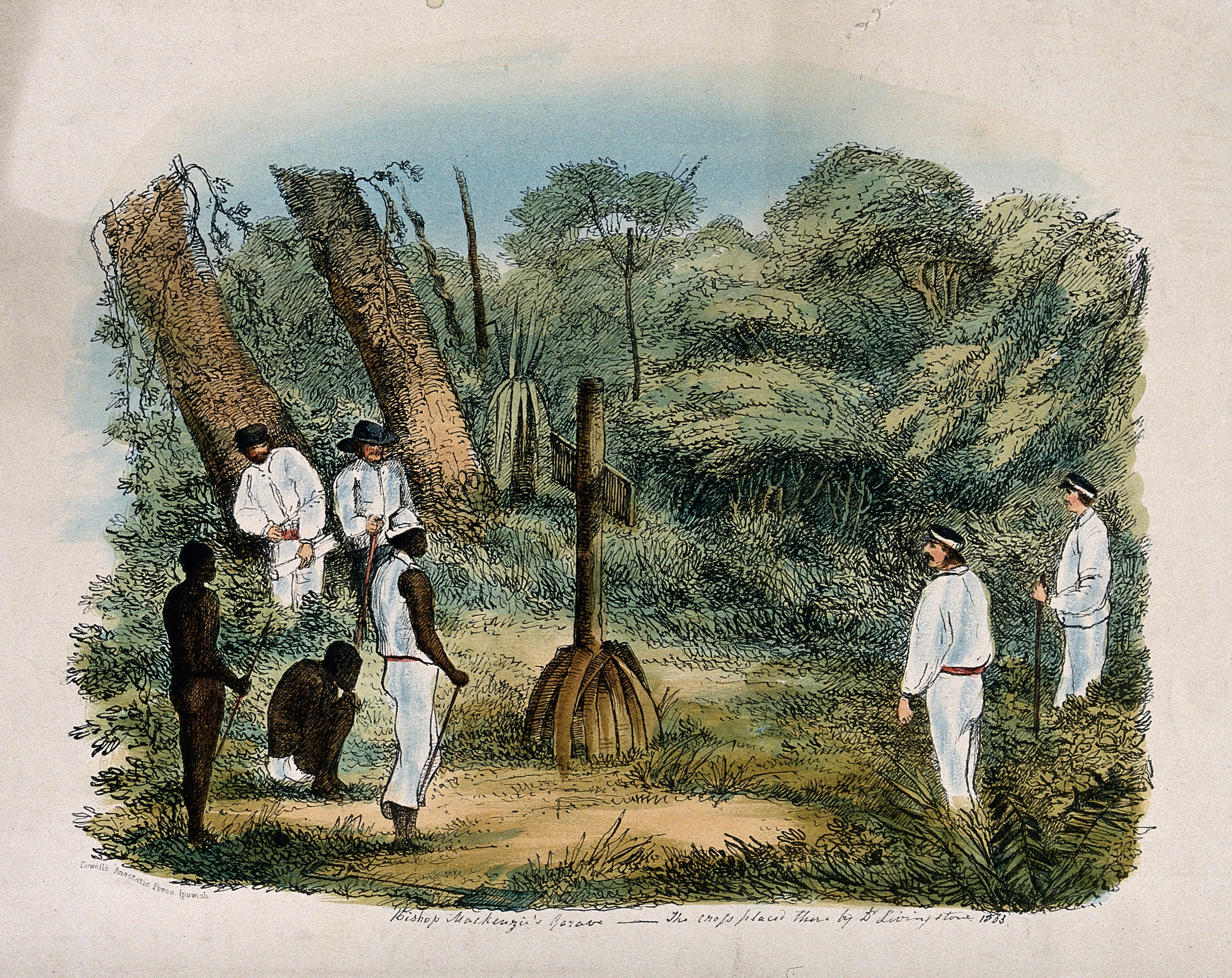
Mackenzie's grave with the cross placed there by David Livingstone in 1863

Moving from Cape Town, Mackenzie sailed with Livingstone up the Zambezi and Shire rivers with a small group, including Horace Waller, to start work. He arrived at Chibisa's village in June 1861 with the goal to establish a mission station at Magomero, near Zomba, while Livingstone continued with his expedition. Mackenzie directly opposed the slave trade causing the enmity of the Yao. He worked among the people of the Manganja country until January 1862 when he went on a supplies trip together with a few members of his party. The boat they were travelling on sank, and as their medical supplies were lost, Mackenzie's malaria could not be treated. He died of Blackwater fever on 31 January 1862 on an island in the Shire River and was buried at Chiromo. Livingstone erected a cross over his grave a year later.

An International school in Lilongwe, Malawi, is named after him.

== See also ==
- Church of the Province of Central Africa

== Notes ==
Religious titles
New title	Bishop of Central Africa; 1861–1862	Succeeded by William Tozer
