= Forbes baronets of Foveran (1700) =

The Forbes baronetcy, of Foveran, Aberdeenshire was created in the Baronetage of Nova Scotia on 10 April 1700 for Samuel Forbes, Member of the Parliament of Scotland for Aberdeenshire 1693–1698 and 1700–1701. The title became dormant on the death of the 3rd Baronet c.1760. It is now considered extinct.

== Forbes baronets, of Foveran (1700) ==
- Sir Samuel Forbes, 1st Baronet (1653–1717), son of Alexander Forbes of Foveran, who d. 1697
- Sir Alexander Forbes, 2nd Baronet (died before 1755), son of the 1st Baronet.
- Sir John Forbes, 3rd Baronet of Knaperna (d. c. 1760), second cousin and heir male, being son and heir of Samuel Forbes of Knaperna, by Margaret, daughter of Hew Crawford, of Jordan Hill which Samuel was son of John Forbes, of Knaperna, younger brother to the 1st Baronet. He succeeded to the title before 1755, but, on his death, the baronetcy became dormant.
