= Colin Mackenzie of Portmore =

Scottish lawyer and companion of Sir Walter Scott

Colin Mackenzie of Portmore WS FRSE (1770–1830) was a Scottish lawyer and companion of Sir Walter Scott.

== Life ==
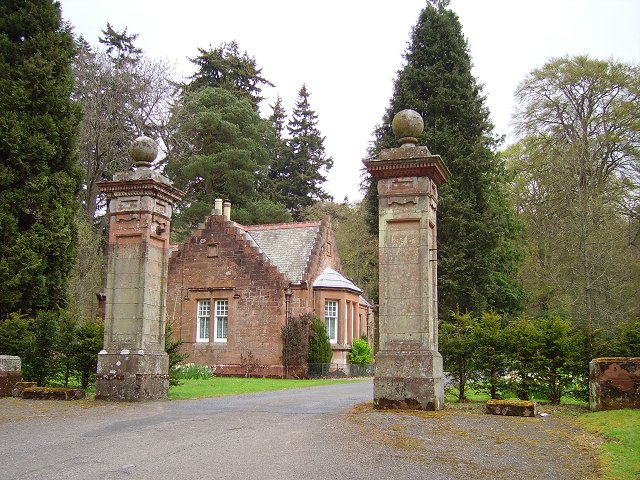
The gates to Portmore (near Eddleston)

Mackenzie was born on 11 January 1770 the son of Alexander Mackenzie of Portmore in Peebleshire and his wife Anne.

He went to school in Edinburgh and was a friend of Walter Scott, travelling with him in later life. He apprenticed as a lawyer with his father, Alexander Mackenzie WS at 14 Princes Street and qualified as a Writer to the Signet in 1790.

In 1800 he was operating as a lawyer from 14 Princes Street in Edinburgh's New Town having then taken over his father's firm.

He was Principal Clerk of Session to the Scottish Courts 1804–1808 and Deputy Keeper of the Signet 1820–1828. In 1822 he was elected a Fellow of the Royal Society of Edinburgh, his proposer being James Skene of Rubislaw.

He died on 16 September 1830.

== Family ==
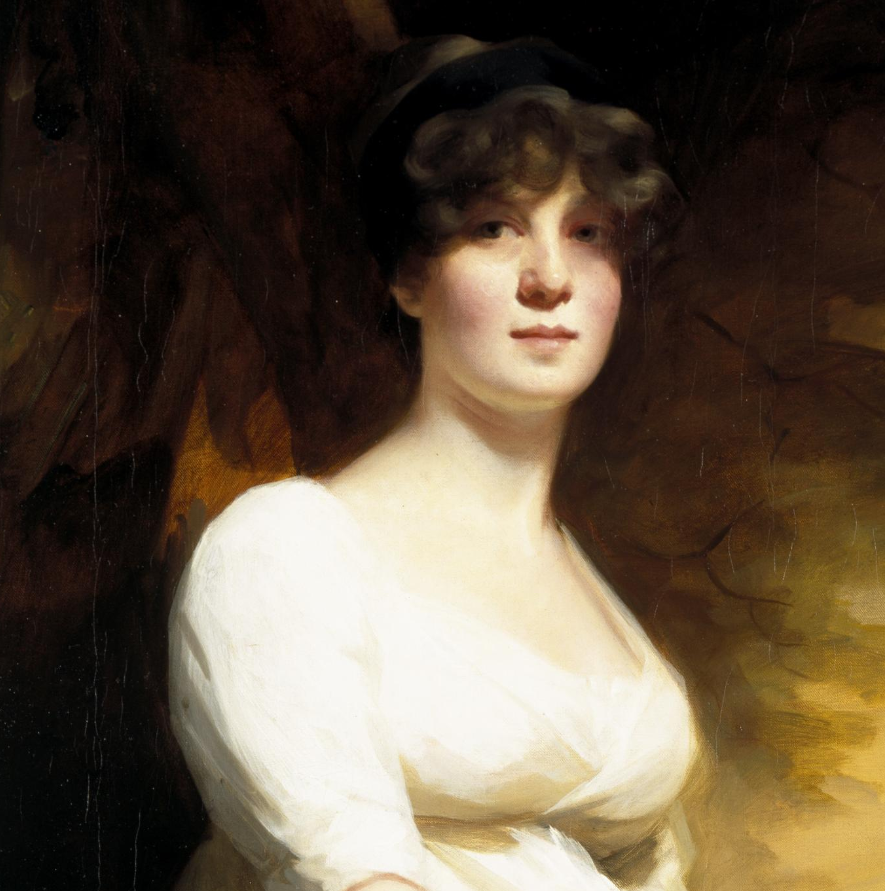
Detail of painting of Elizabeth Forbes of Portmore by Sir Henry Raeburn

His wife, Elizabeth Forbes (1781–1840), whom he married in 1803, was painted by Sir Henry Raeburn. The painting is held by the Scottish National Portrait Gallery. Elizabeth was the daughter of Sir William Forbes, 6th Baronet of Pitsligo.

Their son, John Mackenzie, became Treasurer of the Bank of Scotland. Another son, Charles, became a bishop of the Church of England. Another son, William, became a politician and temperance reformer. A daughter, Anne, was a writer.

== Artistic recognition ==
Mackenzie was sculpted by Thomas Campbell in the 1830s.
