= John Stuart Hepburn Forbes =

Scottish peer and landowner

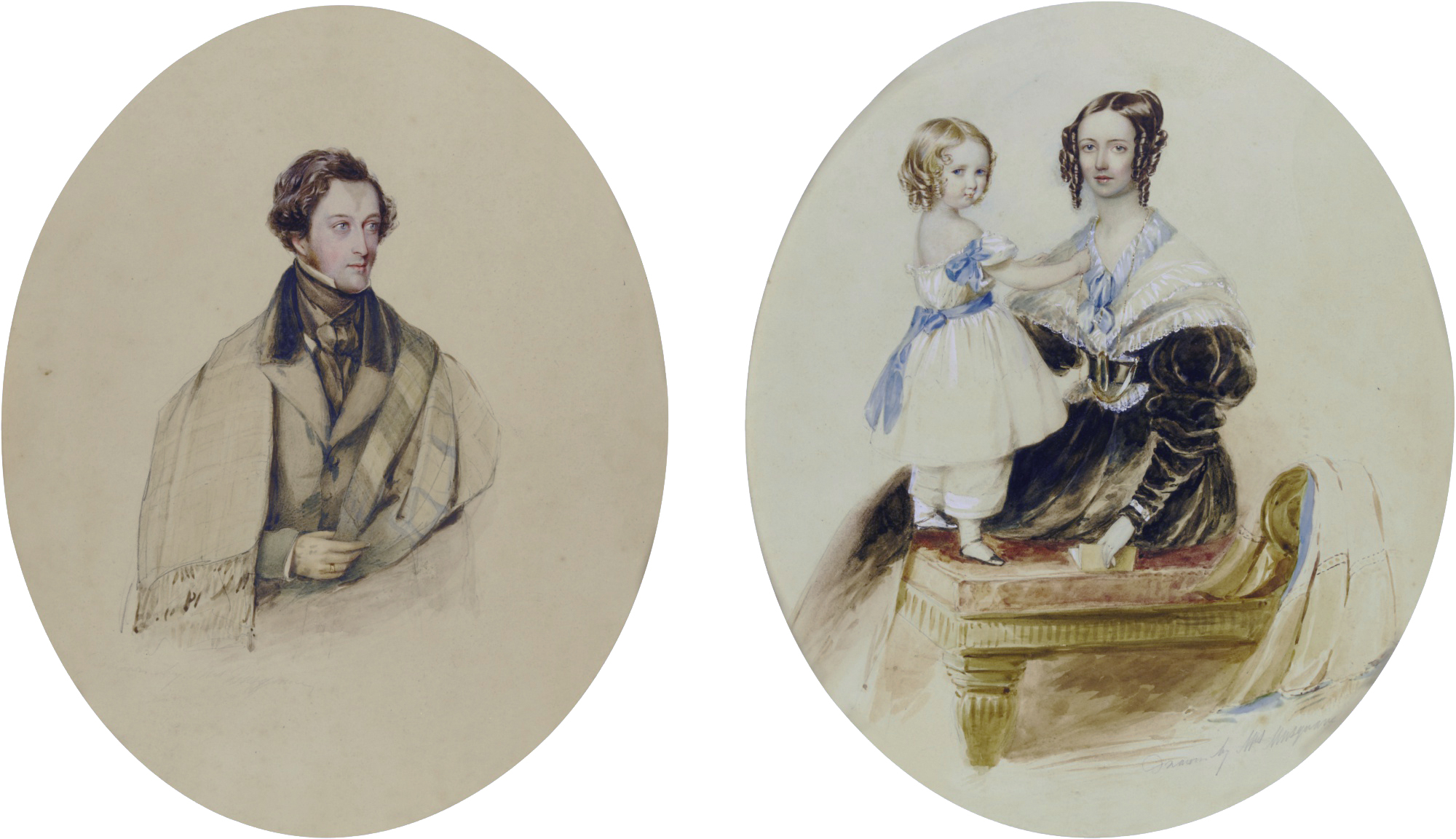
John Stuart Hepburn-Forbes and his wife and daughter

Sir John Stuart Hepburn Forbes, 8th Baronet, of Monymusk, of Fettercairn and Pitsligo, FRSE (1804–1866) was a Scottish baronet, landowner, advocate and agriculturalist. His name sometimes appears as Hepburn-Forbes.

== Life ==
He was born in Dean House in western Edinburgh on 25 September 1804 the son of Williamina Belches Stuart of Invermay and Sir William Forbes of Monymusk and Pitsligo, 7th baronet. His younger brothers included James David Forbes. He studied law at the University of Edinburgh, and qualified as an advocate in 1826.

When his father died in 1828 he became 8th baronet, and took over the family home at 86 George Street. His country estate was at Fettercairn.

In 1833 he was elected a Fellow of the Royal Society of Edinburgh his proposer being Thomas Charles Hope.

He died in London on 28 May 1866. Due to the lack of male heir the baronetcy passed to his nephew, William Stuart Forbes (1835–1906), son of Charles Hay Forbes, thereafter being titled as 9th baronet.

== Family ==
In 1834 he married Lady Harriet Louisa Anne Kerr (d.1884), daughter of William Kerr, 6th Marquess of Lothian. They had one daughter, Harriet Williamina Hepburn-Forbes (1835–1869), who was the mother of Charles John Robert Hepburn-Stuart-Forbes-Trefusis, 21st Baron Clinton.

== Coat of arms ==
Coat of arms of John Stuart Hepburn Forbes
| Crest 1st, a heart, between two wings, expanded; 2nd, out of a baron's coronet, a hand, holding a scimitar, all proper; 3rd, a dexter arm, grasping a sword. Escutcheon Quarterly 1st and 4th grand quarters: 1st and 3rd, azure, on a chevron, between three bears' heads couped argent, muzzled gules, a heart, of the last; 2nd and 4th, quarterly: 1st and 4th, azure, three bears' heads, couped argent, muzzled gules; 2nd and 3rd, azure, three cinquefoils, argent; 2nd and 3rd grand quarters: or, a bend gules, surmounted of a fesse chequy azure and argent. Supporters Two bears, sable. Motto Be Mindful |

== Publications ==
- On the Constitutions and Statistics of the Friendly Societies of the Counties of Aberdeen, Banff and Kincardine
- On Agricultural Meteorology

Baronetage of Nova Scotia
| Preceded by William Forbes | Baronet (of Monymusk); 1828–1866 | Succeeded by William Forbes |
