= Forbes baronets =

Set index for Forbes baronets

There have been five baronetcies created for people with the surname Forbes, four in the Baronetage of Nova Scotia and one in the Baronetage of the United Kingdom.

- Forbes baronets of Monymusk (1626), later Stuart-Forbes
- Forbes baronets of Castle Forbes (1628): see Earl of Granard
- Forbes baronets of Craigievar (1630)
- Forbes baronets of Foveran (1700)
- Forbes baronets of Newe (1823)

== See also ==
- Burn baronets of Jessfield (1923), later Forbes-Leith baronets of Fyvie
