= King's County Royal Rifle Militia =

Auxiliary unit of the British Army

Parsonstown Loyal Independent Volunteers King's County Royal Rifle Militia 3rd (Reserve) Bn, Prince of Wales's Leinster Regiment (Royal Canadians)
- Active: 1776–1922
- Country: Ireland (1776–1800); United Kingdom (1801–1922)
- Branch: Militia/Special Reserve
- Role: Infantry
- Size: 1 Battalion
- Part of: Prince of Wales's Leinster Regiment (Royal Canadians)
- Garrison/HQ: Birr Barracks
- Engagements: Irish Rebellion of 1798; Second Boer War

The King's County Royal Rifle Militia was an Irish Militia regiment in King's County (now County Offaly) dating back to 1776. It later became a battalion of the Prince of Wales's Leinster Regiment (Royal Canadians). It saw action during the Irish Rebellion of 1798 and the Second Boer War, and trained thousands of reinforcements during World War I. It was disbanded in 1922.

== Background ==
Although there are scattered references to town guards in 1584, no organised militia existed in Ireland before 1660. After that date, some militia forces were organised in the reign of King Charles II: in 1683 Sir Lawrence Parsons, 1st Baronet of Birr Castle, was appointed to command all the militia in King's County. It was not until 1715 that the Irish Militia came under statutory authority. During the 18th Century there were various Volunteer Associations and unofficial militia units controlled by the landowners, concerned mainly with internal security. During the War of American Independence, the threat of invasion by the Americans' allies, France and Spain, appeared to be serious. While most of the Regular Army was fighting overseas, the coasts of England and Wales were defended by the embodied Militia, but Ireland had no equivalent force. The Parliament of Ireland passed a Militia Act, but this failed to create an effective force. However it opened the way for the paramilitary Irish Volunteers to fill the gap. Sir Lawrence Parsons (grandson of the above) commanded the mounted militia Troop in King's County. The county also had the Parsonstown Loyal Independent Volunteer Corps raised at Birr in 1776.

The Volunteers were outside the control of either the parliament or the Dublin Castle administration. When the invasion threat receded they diminished in numbers but remained a political force. On the outbreak of the French Revolutionary War In 1793, the Irish administration passed an effective Militia Act that created an official Irish Militia, while the paramilitary volunteers were essentially banned. The new Act was based on existing English precedents, with the men conscripted by ballot to fill county quotas (paid substitutes were permitted) and the officers having to meet certain property qualifications.

== King's County Militia ==
The Parsonstown Volunteers were placed on the militia establishment in 1793 as the King's County Royal Rifle Militia under the command of Sir Lawrence Parsons, 5th Baronet, later 2nd Earl of Rosse. King's County was given a quota of 420 men to fill, in eight companies. Henry Peisley L'Estrange took over as Colonel of the Regiment from 2 April 1798.

=== French Revolutionary War and Irish Rebellion ===
The French Revolutionary and Napoleonic Wars saw the British and Irish militia embodied for a whole generation, becoming regiments of full-time professional soldiers (though restricted to service in Britain or Ireland respectively), which the regular army increasingly saw as a prime source of recruits. They served in coast defences, manned garrisons, guarded prisoners of war, and carried out internal security duties.

The King's County regiment served mainly in the south and west of Ireland in the early part of the war. In August 1794 it was quartered with three companies at Killarney and Ross Castle, two at Tralee, two at Dingle and one at Castleisland. The Irish Militia was augmented in 1795, King's County's quota being increased to 612 men.

Anxiety about a possible French invasion grew during the autumn of 1796 and preparations were made for field operations. A large French expeditionary force appeared in Bantry Bay on 21 December and troops from all over Ireland were marched towards the threatened area. However, the French fleet was scattered by winter storms, several ships being wrecked, and none of the French troops succeeded in landing; there was no sign of a rising by the United Irishmen. The invasion was called off on 29 December, and the troop concentration was dispersed in early 1797. At the same time the Light companies were detached to join composite battalions drawn from several militia regiments; the King's County company joined the 1st Battalion. When the militiamen of 1793 reached the end of their four-year enlistment in 1797, most of the Irish regiments were able to maintain their numbers through re-enlistments (for a bounty). At the time of the Irish Rebellion of 1798 the strength of the militia was boosted by further re-enlistments and recruiting for bounty rather than the ballot.

The men of the King's County Militia were predominantly Roman Catholic, and at the time of the rebellion were not fully trusted by the authorities. However, part of the regiment was in action at Newtownbarry (now known as the Battle of Bunclody) in King's County, where Col L'Estrange had 230 of his King's County Militia, a troop of Dragoons and about 100 Yeomanry Cavalry under his command. With this force he successfully defended the town from attack on 1 June, after which the King's County Militia was accepted as a reliable regiment. As part of the 1st Light Battalion, the King's County Light Company took part in the Battle of Vinegar Hill in County Wexford on 21 June.

Legislation had been rushed through the British Parliament to permit British militia regiments to volunteer for service in suppressing the Irish rebellion. In return a number of Irish militia regiments offered to serve on the mainland afterwards, a proposal supported by the Lord Lieutenant and Commander-in-Chief of Ireland, Marquess Cornwallis. However, these offers were unwelcome to some of the authorities in England, from the King downwards, so as a compromise the King's County and Wexford regiments were permitted to serve in Jersey and Guernsey respectively. The King's County regiment embarked in June 1799 with a strength of 760 privates, 285 women and 259 children, and garrisoned the island for a year while the French invasion threat was still high.

With the diminishing threat of invasion after 1799, the strength of the militia could be reduced, and the surplus men were encouraged to volunteer for regiments of the line. By the end of 1801 peace negotiations with the French were progressing and recruiting and re-enlistment for the Irish Militia was stopped in October. The men received the new clothing they were due on 25 December, but the Treaty of Amiens was signed in March and the warrant for disembodying the regiments was issued in May 1802. The men were paid off, leaving only the permanent staff of non-commissioned officers (NCOs) and drummers under the regimental adjutant.

=== Napoleonic Wars ===
The Peace of Amiens was short-lived, and preparations to re-embody the Irish Militia began in November 1802. By March 1803 most of the regiments had been ordered to enlist men, a process which was aided by the number of previous militiamen who re-enlisted. Britain declared war on France on 18 May 1803 and the warrant to embody the Irish Militia was issued the next day. The light companies were once again detached to form composite light battalions, but these were discontinued in 1806.

Over the following years the regiments carried out garrison duties at various towns across Ireland, attended summer training camps, and reacted to various invasion scares, none of which materialised. They also provided volunteers to transfer to the Regular Army. In 1805 the militia establishment was raised to allow for this.

Birr Barracks was built between 1809 and 1812 at the instigation of the Earl of Rosse, who had argued the need for some barracks within two hours' march of the River Shannon.

An 'Interchange Act' was passed in July 1811 permitting British and Irish militia units to volunteer for service across the Irish Sea. By the end of July 34 out of 38 Irish militia regiments had volunteered for this service, but only 15 travelled to England, the King's County not being among them.

Napoleon abdicated in April 1814 and with the end of the war most Irish Militia regiments marched back to their home counties and were disembodied. However, they were called out again during the brief Waterloo campaign and its aftermath. The order to stand down finally arrived early in 1816 and the King's County Militia was accordingly disembodied.

=== Long Peace ===
After Waterloo there was a long peace. Although officers continued to be commissioned into the militia and ballots might still held, the regiments were rarely assembled for training and the permanent staffs of militia regiments were progressively reduced. William Parsons, Lord Oxmantown (3rd Earl of Rosse from 1841) was colonel of the King's County Rifles from 19 June 1834, and his younger brother the Hon Laurence Parsons was lieutenant-colonel from 24 December 1847. Charles Bury, 2nd Earl of Charleville was major from 28 June 1831 until his death in 1851.

== 1852 Reforms ==
The Militia of the United Kingdom was revived by the Militia Act 1852, enacted during a renewed period of international tension. As before, units were raised and administered on a county basis, and filled by voluntary enlistment (although conscription by means of the Militia Ballot might be used if the counties failed to meet their quotas). Training was for 56 days on enlistment, then for 21–28 days per year, during which the men received full army pay. Under the Act, Militia units could be embodied by Royal Proclamation for full-time home defence service in three circumstances:

1. 'Whenever a state of war exists between Her Majesty and any foreign power'.
2. 'In all cases of invasion or upon imminent danger thereof'.
3. 'In all cases of rebellion or insurrection'.

The King's County Royal Rifle Militia was revived, the Earl of Rosse remaining as colonel, but with a large number of new officers. The position of colonel in the militia disappeared after the 1852 Act, the lieutenant-colonel generally being the commanding officer (CO) and the position of honorary colonel was created. The Earl of Rosse died in 1867.

=== Crimean War and after ===
The Crimean War broke out in 1854 and after a large expeditionary force was sent overseas, the militia began to be called out. The Kings County Rifles was embodied on 16 April 1855. It spent the entire term of its embodiment at Birr, and was stood down on 28 July 1856. It was not re-embodied during the Indian Mutiny.

The reformed militia settled into a routine of annual training. The regiments now had a large cadre of permanent staff (about 30) and a number of the officers were former Regulars. Around a third of the recruits and many young officers went on to join the Regular Army. The Militia Reserve introduced in 1867 consisted of present and former militiamen who undertook to serve overseas in case of war. They were called out in 1878 during the international crisis caused by the Russo-Turkish War.

== Cardwell & Childers Reforms ==
Under the 'Localisation of the Forces' scheme introduced by the Cardwell Reforms of 1872, militia regiments were brigaded with their local linked regular regiments. For the King's County Rifles this was in Sub-District No 67 (Counties of Meath, Westmeath and Longford, and King's and Queen's Counties) in Dublin District of Irish Command:

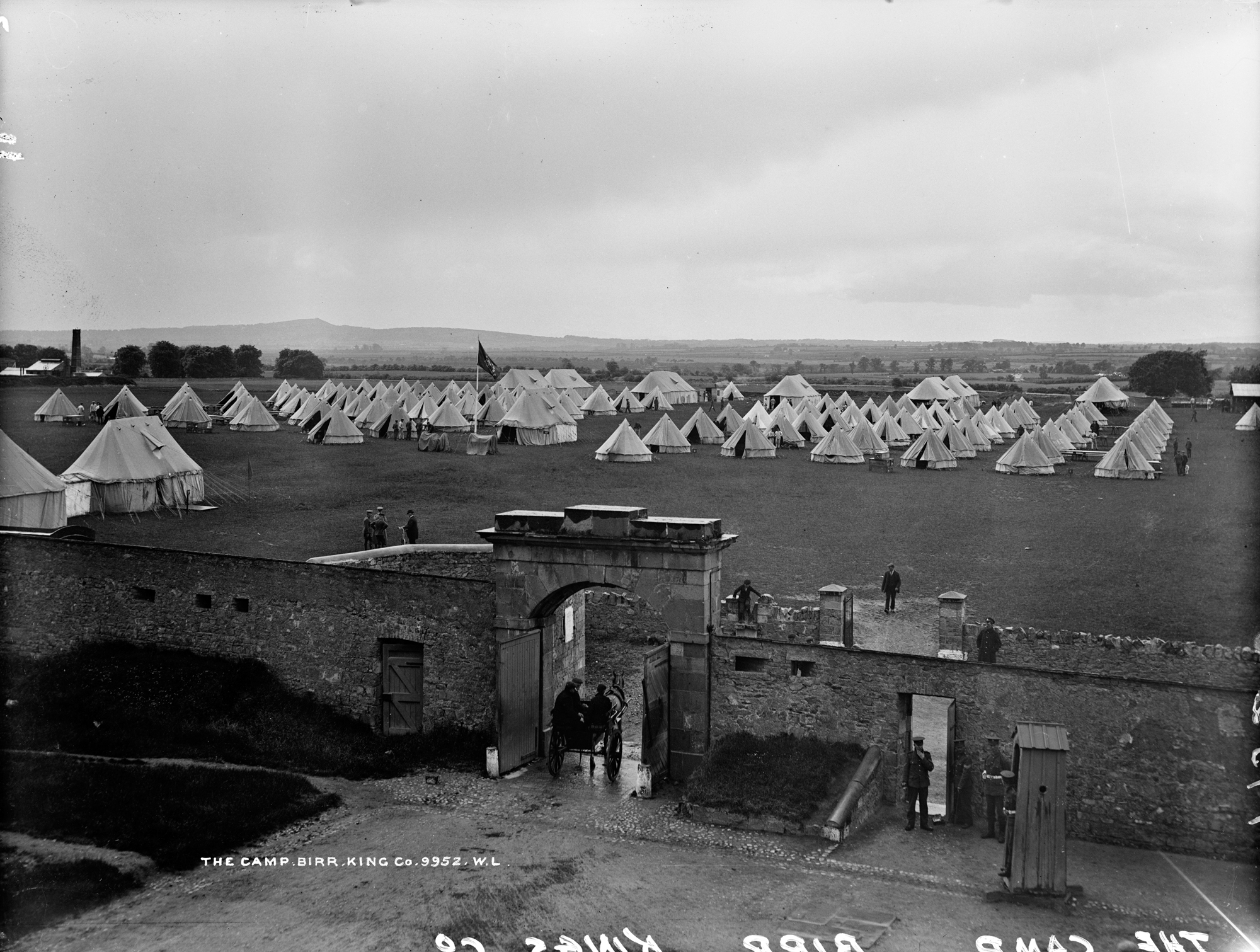
Troops camped outside Birr Barracks, ca 1900.

- 100th (Prince of Wales's Royal Canadian) Regiment of Foot
- 109th (Bombay Infantry) Regiment of Foot
- Royal Longford Rifles
- King's County Rifles
- Queen's County Rifles
- Westmeath Rifles
- Royal Meath Militia

A Brigade Depot was formed in April 1873 at Birr, the King's County Rifles' headquarters. Although often referred to as brigades, the sub-districts were purely administrative organisations, but in a continuation of the Cardwell Reforms a mobilisation scheme began to appear in the Army List from December 1875. This assigned regular and militia units to places in an order of battle of corps, divisions and brigades for the 'Active Army', even though these formations were entirely theoretical, with no staff or services assigned. The King's County Rifles were assigned to 1st Brigade of 2nd Division, III Corps. The brigade, consisting of three Irish Militia regiments, would have mustered at Redhill in Surrey in time of war.

=== 3rd Battalion, Leinster Regiment ===
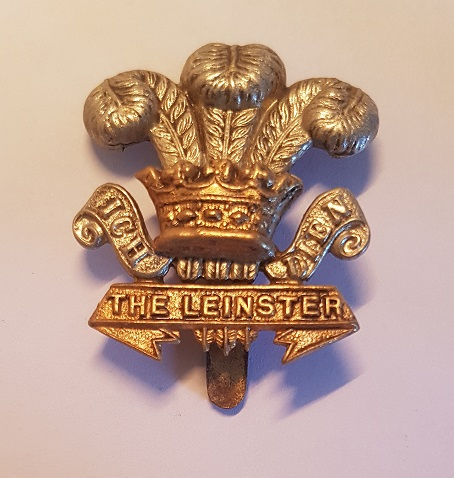
Prince of Wales's Leinster Regiment cap badge.

The Childers Reforms took Cardwell's reforms further, with the linked battalions forming single regiments. From 1 July 1881 the 100th and 109th Regiments became the 1st and 2nd Battalions of the Prince of Wales's Leinster Regiment (Royal Canadians), and three of the militia battalions followed in numerical sequence. The King's County Rifles became the 3rd (King's County Militia) Battalion, the Queen's County became the 4th Bn and the Royal Meath the 5th Bn (the Longford Rifles and Westmeath joined the Rifle Brigade).

In 1894 a group of masked militia officers broke into the quarters of Surgeon Major Fox at Birr Barracks and assaulted two of his servants. This 'Birr Barracks Scandal' was widely reported at the time. The servants initially identified Maj Warner Hastings, 15th Earl of Huntingdon, as one of the masked assailants, but he was found to have a solid alibi and was acquitted.

=== Second Boer War ===
After the Second Boer War broke out in October 1899 an expeditionary force was sent to South Africa and the militia reserve was called out. Later the militia regiments began to be embodied to replace the regulars for home defence. The 3rd Leinsters were embodied on 18 January 1900 and moved to Shrapnel Barracks, Woolwich, for garrison duty. However, there was a pressing need for additional troops in South Africa, and on 8 February the battalion was asked if it would volunteer. All but two men immediately did so. Major the Earl of Huntingdon volunteered but was found unfit for overseas service, so he resigned as second-in-command. He and the Countess collected gifts and comforts for the men of the battalion on service, and took custody of the Colours at Sharavogue House until it returned.

On 7 March the battalion embarked on the RMS Kildonan Castle with a strength of 18 officers and 476 ORs in six companies under the command of Col Holroyd Smyth. The troopship arrived at Table Bay on 26 March, and was then sent on to East London, where the battalion disembarked on 2 April. It moved about 100 miles (160 km) to the important railway junction of Queenstown.

At Queenstown the battalion camped on the western side of the town and began guarding a section of the line of communication between Tylden and Bushmans Hoek, the Left Half Battalion being pushed forward to Sterkstroom. On 7 April it was held in readiness to proceed by rail to repel an attack on Bethulie, but it was not called upon and remained in position for the next 5 months. On 8 August 1900 3rd Bn moved to Stormberg, with battalion headquarters at the railway station. It formed a chain of outposts on the adjacent hills to connect up the junction with Steynsburg to the west and Burgersdorp in the north, with detachments stationed at Bamboo Bridges and Wandersboom. The Left Half Bn under Maj William Barry was later moved about 60 miles (97 km) to Aliwal North and began building earthworks to protect the Orange River bridge, as well as providing escorts for convoys into the Orange Free State. During September the enemy was active along the Orange River and a party under Capt H.G. Sheppard was sent to Albert Junction to watch the river. On 2 October the Boers were reported to be marching on Stormberg, the garrison was reinforced with Cape Police, and a strong inlying picquet established to protect the vital railway junction, while all other available troops went out to try to intercept the enemy. Next day the Boers were driven back from the river, but they established themselves in the Zurberg Mountains within striking distance of the junction. Here they continued their harassing tactics with frequent attempts to destroy rail lines, meaning that the men of 3rd Bn were under arms day and night until December.

During this period the Right Half Bn at Stormberg provided the crew of a small Armoured train, The Leinster Lily, which patrolled the lines. On 27 December the Left Half Bn had a long-distance exchange of fire with a party of Boers. Early in 1901 the second-in-command, Lt-Col F. Luttman-Johnson, was ordered construct a series of blockhouses to defend the rail junction. On 20 March the party guarding Driefontein Drift on the Orange River was attacked by a strong force of Boers, but a detached party of 3rd Leinsters successfully outflanked the Boers and drove them off their strong Kopje position. On 18 April the Boers held up a train at Twist Neet, between Moltens and Stormberg, looting and burning the waggons. Captain Sheppard's party, about 120 strong, drove them off, saving part of the train and capturing a few Boers.

On 30 April 3rd Bn moved to Kimberley. Here it formed a Mounted infantry squadron, which was used for scouting and convoy escorts. They were frequently in action but only suffered two casualties. A detachment of 100 men from 3rd Bn under Maj Barry was attached to the Kimberley Column for six months, operating in pursuit of the Boer guerrillas. By now a line of blockhouses had been established between Modder River and Warrenton, and 3rd Bn provided garrisons for these, as well as men for an armoured train operating between Modder River and Mafeking. The battalion also provided detachments at Smiths Drift, Danils Kieul and Jacobsdal. While the 3rd Bn was at Kimberley Col Holroyd Smyth was invalided home and Lt-Col Luttman-Johnson took over command.

On 9 October the battalion moved to Modder River to protect the repaired railway bridge and to man the blockhouse line between Enslin and Spyfontein, with Lt-Col Luttman-Johnson appointed commandant of the district. The duties were onerous, and the band and battalion staff had to take their turn in the blockhouses, some of which only had three men to work on the railway line by day and keep watch at night.

Peace negotiations having begun, the battalion re-embarked for home on 6 May 1902 aboard the troopship SS Canada. It reached Queenstown on 25 May and entrained next day for Birr, where it was disembodied on 26 May 1902. During its service in South Africa the battalion had lost one officer and 25 ORs killed or died of disease. The battalion was awarded the Battle honour South Africa 1900–02, and the participants received the Queen's South Africa Medal with clasps for 'Cape Colony', 'Orange Free State' and 'Transvaal', and the King's South Africa Medal withy clasps for 'South Africa 1901' and 'South Africa 1901'. Both colonels Smyth and Luttman-Jonshon were awarded the Distinguished Service Order (DSO)

== Special Reserve ==
After the Boer War, the future of the militia was called into question. There were moves to reform the Auxiliary Forces (Militia, Yeomanry and Volunteers) to take their place in the six Army Corps proposed by the Secretary of State for War, St John Brodrick. However, little of Brodrick's scheme was carried out. Under the more sweeping Haldane Reforms of 1908, the Militia was replaced by the Special Reserve (SR), a semi-professional force whose role was to provide reinforcement drafts for regular units serving overseas in wartime, rather like the earlier Militia Reserve. The battalion transferred to the SR on 12 July 1908 as the 3rd (Reserve) Battalion of the Leinsters, while the 4th (Queen's County Militia) and 5th (Royal Meath Militia) Bns became 'Extra Reserve' Bns, possibly to be sent overseas in the event of war.

=== World War I ===
On the outbreak of World War I on 4 August 1914 3rd (R) Battalion was embodied at Birr under the command of Lt-Col A. Canning, and completing its mobilisation on 7 August it went by rail the next day to its war station at Shanbally Camp at Monkstown, County Cork. There it formed a brigade with the 4th and 5th (ER) Bns under the command of Lt-Col Sir Anthony Weldon, 6th Baronet, DSO. Daily working parties of 250 men were put to digging trenches to protect the naval base of Queenstown under the supervision of the Royal Engineers. The battalion also had to find guards for Haulbowline, Spike Island, Corkbeg Wireless Station and other vital points, as well as guarding German Prisoners-of-War (PoWs) at Templemore. All these duties interfered with the battalion's other role of training reinforcement drafts for the Regular battalions serving overseas. On 20 August the battalion moved from Shanbally Camp into Victoria Barracks at Cork, which had been vacated by the 2nd Bn going to France with the British Expeditionary Force.

On 8 October 1914 the SR battalions were ordered to form service battalions from their surplus recruits for Kitchener's 4th New Army, and the 3rd (Reserve) Bn should have formed an 8th (Service) Battalion. However this order was cancelled for most of the Irish regiments on 25 October and no 8th Bn was ever formed for the Leinsters.

By the end of 1914 the 3rd (R) Bn had sent out 13 officers and 436 ORs as reinforcement drafts. Early in 1915 the PoWs at Templemore were moved to England, reducing the battalion's commitments. Additional training courses had to be introduced, covering anti-gas measures, night operations etc.. During 1915 3rd (R) Bn sent 51 officers and 2042 ORs to the 1st, 2nd and 6th Bns in the field. Lieutenant-Col Canning was transferred to command 1/7th Bn, Manchester Regiment at Gallipoli on 15 June 1915 and Maj W.B. Read was promoted from second-in-command to take over 3rd Bn.

By the beginning of 1916 the flow of volunteers had virtually dried up (and conscription was not imposed in Ireland), yet the demand for drafts was such that elementary training in the battalion was reduced to 11 weeks, the men to complete their training at the reinforcement depots in France. Many of the drafts sent out consisted of returning wounded and sick. However, the battalion also had to train large numbers of officer cadets before they were passed on to the Young Officers Training Corps at Fermoy. Musketry training for all ranks was undertaken on ranges at Kilworth and Youghal, and a field training centre with a trench system was established at Mayfield. During the Easter Rising the 3rd (R) Bn at Queenstown was placed under active service conditions and had to provide extra guards. Meanwhile, the officer cadets at Fermoy were equipped with full service kit and sent to guard the munitions factory at Wexford, later forming flying columns to round up suspects. The crisis slowly passed and normal training was resumed. Lieutenant-Col Canning, who had been invalided home from Gallipoli, returned to command 3rd (R) Bn.

On 24 June 1917 the battalion was turned out at midnight when Sinn Féin demonstrators wrecked the recruiting office and nearby shops in Cork. The area was cleared with a bayonet charge, 'many casualties' were reported including one rioter killed. Pickets equipped with machine guns were posted in the streets for several days afterwards. The troops were confined to barracks to avoid confrontation during a subsequent visit to Cork by the Sinn Féin leader Éamon de Valera. The political pressure on Irish battalions in Ireland at this time was such that in November 1917 they were moved to England. 3rd Leinsters entrained at Cork on 5 November and embarked at Dublin for Holyhead. It was then sent to join the Portsmouth garrison, where it remained for the rest of the war. The men were quartered in Victoria Barracks and took over Southsea Common and Fort Nelson for training. The battalion also used a revolver range in the grounds of Southsea Castle, the Bombing and Trench Mortar School at Lyndhurst, and Southern Command's School of Musketry at Hayling Island and Gas School at Sandown, Isle of Wight.

The losses incurred during the German spring offensive of March 1918 led to increased demands for drafts from the training battalions. On 25 May the 4th and 5th (Extra Reserve) Bns of the Leinsters (the old Queen's County and Royal Meath Militia), stationed at Dover and Glencorse Barracks respectively, were closed down and their remaining personnel transferred to 3rd (R) Bn at Portsmouth. The battalion continued preparing drafts until the end of the war in November 1918.

== Disbandment ==
With the establishment of the Irish Free State in 1922, all British Army regiments based in Southern Ireland were disbanded, including the Prince of Wales's Own Leinsters. The 3rd (Reserve) Battalion was consequently disbanded on 31 July 1922.

== Commanders ==
=== Colonels ===
Colonel of the Regiment included;

- Lawrence Parsons, 2nd Earl of Rosse, from formation in 1793
- Henry Peisley L'Estrange, from 2 April 1798
- William Parsons, 3rd Earl of Rosse, from 19 June 1834

=== Lieutenant-Colonels ===
Lieutenant-colonels (COs after 1852) included:

- Herbert Rawson Stepney, appointed 13 May 1801
- Maurice Nugent O'Connor, appointed supernumerary Lt-Col 12 November 1801
- Hon Laurence Parsons appointed 24 December 1847
- Lt-Col Thomas Bernard, half-pay captain, 12th Lancers, appointed 6 March 1855
- Hon Alfred Bury (later 5th Earl of Charleville), former captain 10th Foot, promoted to lt-col 25 March 1871
- Richard W. Bernard, formerly of the Austrian service, appointed captain 27 September 1846, promoted to major 25 March 1871, lt-col 11 August 1875
- A.C. Wolseley-Cox, former lieutenant, 12th Lancers, captain 1 April 1871, lt-col 10 November 1877
- Robert Godolphin Cosby, former lieutenant, 6th (Inniskilling) Dragoons, appointed 23 November 1889
- J.H.G. Smyth, DSO, appointed 18 November 1893, later honorary rank of colonel
- Fred Luttman-Johnson, DSO, retired Lt-Col of the York and Lancaster Regiment, appointed major 16 February 1900, promoted 16 December 1900, later honorary rank of colonel
- William E.A. Barry, appointed 2 July 1905
- A. Canning, retired Major, Leinsters, appointed 6 August 1912; transferred to command 1/7th Bn Manchester Regiment, 15 June 1915; returned during 1916
- W.B. Read, temporarily promoted from second-in-command 1915–16

=== Honorary Colonel ===
The following served as Honorary Colonel:

- Thomas Bernard, former CO
- Col R.G. Cosby, former CO, appointed 4 November 1898, reappointed to SR 12 July 1908

=== Other notable officers ===
- Charles Bury, 2nd Earl of Charleville, major from 28 June 1831
- Sir Clement Wolseley, 7th Baronet, appointed major 22 June 1878
- Warner Hastings, 15th Earl of Huntingdon, previously lieutenant in 4th (Queen's County Militia) Bn, Leinsters, appointed captain 28 September 1889, promoted major 9 December 1893, resigned 28 February 1900, reappointed 4 June 1901, resigned with honorary rank of Lt-Col 18 March 1905
- John Vincent Holland, won a Victoria Cross with 7th Bn Leinsters at the Battle of the Somme, having been commissioned into the 3rd (R) Bn

== Heritage & ceremonial ==
=== Uniforms & insignia ===
Little is known of the King's County Rifles' uniforms, but from their reformation in 1852 the facing colour is given as scarlet, presumably on a Rifle green jacket. The regiment's badge appears to be its precedence number 98 enclosed in the coil of a light infantry bugle-horn.

It adopted the scarlet coat and blue facings of the Leinsters as well as the badge when it became a battalion of that regiment in 1881.

=== Precedence ===
On the outbreak of the French Revolutionary War the English counties had drawn lots to determine the relative precedence of their militia regiments. In 1798 the new Irish militia regiments received their own table of precedence, in which King's County came 19th. In 1833 King William IV drew the lots to determine an order of precedence for the whole of the United Kingdom. Those regiments raised before 1783 took the first 69 places, followed by the 60 regiments (including those in Ireland) raised for the French Revolutionary War: King's County took 98th place, and this remained unchanged when the list was updated in 1855. Most regiments took little notice of the numeral, but the King's County Rifles incorporated it into their cap badge (see above).

=== Battle honour ===
The battalion was awarded the Battle honour South Africa 1900–02 for its service in the Second Boer War. This was rescinded in 1910 when the SR battalions assumed the same honours as their parent regiments.

== See also ==
- Irish Militia
- Militia (United Kingdom)
- Special Reserve
- Prince of Wales's Leinster Regiment (Royal Canadians)
