= Royal Meath Militia =

Auxiliary unit of the British Army

Royal Meath Militia 5th (Extra Reserve) Bn, Prince of Wales's Leinster Regiment (Royal Canadians)
- Active: 25 April 1793 – 31 July 1922
- Country: Ireland (1793–1800); United Kingdom (1801–1922)
- Branch: Militia/Special Reserve
- Role: Infantry
- Size: 1 Battalion
- Part of: Prince of Wales's Leinster Regiment (Royal Canadians)
- Garrison/HQ: Kells; Trim; Navan; Drogheda
- Engagements: Irish Rebellion of 1798: Battle of Three Rocks; Battle of New Ross; Battle of Vinegar Hill; Easter Rising

The Royal Meath Militia was an Irish Militia regiment in County Meath raised in 1793. It later became a battalion of the Prince of Wales's Leinster Regiment (Royal Canadians). It saw action during the Irish Rebellion of 1798 and the Easter Rising in 1916, and trained hundreds of reinforcements during World War I. It was disbanded in 1922.

== Background ==
Although there are scattered references to town guards in 1584, no organised militia existed in Ireland before 1660. After that date, some militia forces were organised in the reign of King Charles II but it was not until 1715 that the Irish Militia came under statutory authority. During the 18th Century there were various Volunteer Associations and unofficial militia units controlled by the landowners, concerned mainly with internal security. During the War of American Independence, the threat of invasion by the Americans' allies, France and Spain, appeared to be serious. While most of the Regular Army was fighting overseas, the coasts of England and Wales were defended by the embodied Militia, but Ireland had no equivalent force. The Parliament of Ireland passed a Militia Act, but this failed to create an effective force. However it opened the way for the paramilitary Irish Volunteers to fill the gap. The Volunteers were outside the control of either the parliament or the Dublin Castle administration. When the invasion threat receded they diminished in numbers but remained a political force. On the outbreak of the French Revolutionary War In 1793, the Irish administration passed an effective Militia Act that created an official Irish Militia, while the paramilitary volunteers were essentially banned. The new Act was based on existing English precedents, with the men conscripted by ballot to fill county quotas (paid substitutes were permitted) and the officers having to meet certain property qualifications.

== Royal Meath Militia ==
County Meath was given a quota of 488 men to find, in eight companies, and the Royal Meath Militia was formed. (Note: It is claimed that the regiment was given the title 'Royal' because County Meath had once been the residence of an Irish king.) Thomas Taylour, Viscount Headfort, was commissioned as Colonel on 25 April 1793. (He succeeded as 2nd Earl of Bective in 1795 and was created Marquess of Headfort in 1800.)

=== French Revolutionary War ===
The French Revolutionary and Napoleonic Wars saw the British and Irish militia embodied for a whole generation, becoming regiments of full-time professional soldiers (though restricted to service in Britain or Ireland respectively), which the regular army increasingly saw as a prime source of recruits. They served in coast defences, manned garrisons, guarded prisoners of war, and carried out internal security duties.

The newly-formed Royal Meath Militia left its county in August 1793 and was quartered at Cashel, County Tipperary, later moving to Cork. By late August 1794 it was at Charles Fort. The Irish Militia was augmented in 1795, County Meath's quota being increased to 612 men. In December that year a soldier of the Meath Militia was shot through the head by a woman in Skibbereen, and the men would have sacked the town had not their officers prevented them.

Anxiety about a possible French invasion grew during the autumn of 1796 and preparations were made for field operations. A large French expeditionary force appeared in Bantry Bay on 21 December and troops from all over Ireland were marched towards the threatened area: the Royal Meath was one of the first to arrive. However, the French fleet was scattered by winter storms, several ships being wrecked, and none of the French troops succeeded in landing; there was no sign of a rising by the United Irishmen. The invasion was called off on 29 December, and the troop concentration was dispersed in early 1797. The Royal Meaths went to Youghal and Waterford. At the same time the Light companies were detached to join composite battalions drawn from several militia regiments; the Meath company joined 2nd Light Battalion. When the militiamen of 1793 reached the end of their four-year enlistment in 1797, most of the Irish regiments were able to maintain their numbers through re-enlistments (for a bounty). At the time of the Irish Rebellion of 1798 the strength of the militia was boosted by further re-enlistments and recruiting for bounty rather than the ballot.

=== Irish Rebellion ===
On the outbreak of the Rebellion the Royal Meaths were sent to relieve Wexford. A company escorting a train of artillery was ambushed by the United Irishmen and cut up at the First Action at Forth Mountain (or Battle of Three Rocks) on 30 May. The captain and two subalterns, four sergeants and 94 privates of the regiment and gunners were killed and the guns were captured by the rebels, who drove off a second advance that afternoon. However, the Royal Meaths were part of the successful Defence of New Ross on 5 June, the decisive Battle of Vinegar Hill on 21 June, which broke the back of the rebellion, and possibly at Fox's Hill on 29 June or Foulkesmill on 20 June. (Note: One source refers to the regiment being present at 'Fokes'.)

In 1799 the regiment moved into Connaught and was quartered at Castlebar. Thomas Pepper became the regiment's Lieutenant-Colonel on 14 June that year, and the acting commanding officer (CO) in the absence of the colonel on other duties. Pepper held the position for nearly 50 years. In 1801 the regiment was granted a supernumerary lieutenant-colonel and a second major, leading to a number of promotions.

With the diminishing threat of invasion after 1799, the strength of the militia could be reduced, and the surplus men were encouraged to volunteer for regiments of the line. By the end of 1801 peace negotiations with the French were progressing and recruiting and re-enlistment for the Irish Militia was stopped in October. The men received the new clothing they were due on 25 December, but the Treaty of Amiens was signed in March 1802 when the regiment was disembodied. The men were paid off at Kells on 16 March, leaving only the permanent staff of non-commissioned officers (NCOs) and drummers under the regimental adjutant.

=== Napoleonic Wars ===
The Peace of Amiens was short-lived, and preparations to re-embody the Irish Militia began in November 1802. By March 1803 most of the regiments had been ordered to enlist men, a process that was aided by the number of previous militiamen who re-enlisted. Britain declared war on France on 18 May 1803 and the warrant to embody the Irish Militia was issued the next day. The light companies were once again detached to form composite light battalions, but these were discontinued in 1806.

Over the following years the regiments carried out garrison duties at various towns across Ireland, attended summer training camps, and reacted to various invasion scares, none of which materialised. They also provided volunteers to transfer to the regular army. In 1805 the militia establishment was raised to allow for this.

Trouble arose in the Irish Militia in 1807–08 over the men enlisted or re-enlisted in 1803. Many were under the impression that they had signed up for five years and would gain their discharge during 1808, whereas their attestation was for five years 'or for such further time as the militia shall be embodied', but the situation was confused by additional wording in the oath. Many regiments came close to mutiny over the issue, which was put to the law officers. The situation in the Royal Meath was worse: it was discovered that the form of the oath they had taken was not as laid down by the Militia Acts. The colonel, the Marquess of Headfort, was ordered back from London to rejoin his regiment and negotiate a settlement. He claimed a 'severe Rhumatic (sic) attack' and declined to travel to Ireland. However, he offered personally to pay two guineas (£2.10) to compensate each man in the regiment who was affected, and this gratuity encouraged 90 men to re-enlist, while 20 had volunteered for the regulars, leaving only 20 cases unsettled. Volunteering for the Line began on 1 October 1807, and proceeded briskly. The ballot was then used to refill the depleted ranks of the militia regiments, though most counties were able to obtain enough volunteers. Only one parish in Meath held a ballot, and that was not enforced.

In July 1811 an 'Interchange Act' was passed and Irish Militia regiments were invited to volunteer for up to two years' service anywhere in the United Kingdom, exchanging with English and Scottish units. The Royal Meath was one of the regiments that volunteered, and on 26 January 1812 it embarked from Cork, where it had been stationed since 1810, and landed at Harwich, proceeding to quarters in Ipswich. Later it served at Chelmsford and Bristol. From November 1812 to April 1813 the regiment carried out guard duty at the large Prisoner-of-war camp at Norman Cross Prison.

Napoleon abdicated in April 1814. With the end of the war most Irish Militia regiments returned to their home counties to be disembodied, the Royal Meath regiment doing so at Kells on 1 August. The regiment was called out again in May 1815 during the brief Waterloo campaign and its aftermath. The order to stand down finally arrived early in 1816.

=== Long Peace ===
After Waterloo there was a long peace. Although officers continued to be commissioned into the militia and ballots might still held, the regiments were rarely assembled for training and the permanent staffs of militia regiments were progressively reduced. On 7 April 1823 Thomas Taylour, Earl of Bective followed his father the Marquess of Headfort as colonel of the Royal Meath Militia. Lieutenant-Col Pepper was finally succeeded on 12 December 1846 by Thomas Edward Taylor, a kinsman of the Marquesses of Headfort and former captain in the 6th Dragoon Guards. He was Member of Parliament (MP) for County Dublin.

== 1852 Reforms ==
The Militia of the United Kingdom was revived by the Militia Act 1852, enacted during a renewed period of international tension. As before, units were raised and administered on a county basis, and filled by voluntary enlistment (although conscription by means of the Militia Ballot might be used if the counties failed to meet their quotas). Training was for 56 days on enlistment, then for 21–28 days per year, during which the men received full army pay. Under the Act, Militia units could be embodied by Royal Proclamation for full-time home defence service in three circumstances:

1. 'Whenever a state of war exists between Her Majesty and any foreign power'.
2. 'In all cases of invasion or upon imminent danger thereof'.
3. 'In all cases of rebellion or insurrection'.

The Royal Meath Militia was revived. The rank of colonel in the militia disappeared after the 1852 Act and the positions of Honorary Colonel and Lieutenant-Colonel Commandant were created. In the Royal Meath these continued to be filled by the 2nd Marquess of Headfort and Thomas Taylor, but a large number of new officers were commissioned.

=== Crimean War and after ===
The Crimean War broke out in 1854 and after a large expeditionary force was sent overseas, the militia began to be called out for home defence. The Royal Meath Militia was embodied during 1854. At first it remained at Kells, then moved a short distance to Trim, County Meath during July 1855. It stayed there until the end of the war when it was disembodied. The HQ of the regiment remained at Trim after it was disembodied, but later moved to Navan.

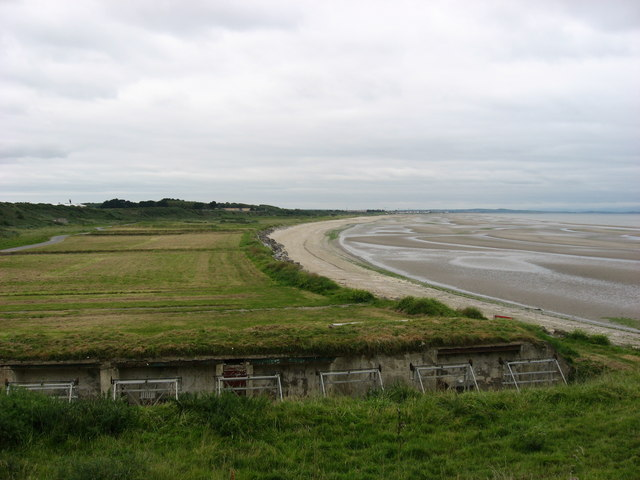
Mosney Rifle Range at Gormaston, Co Meath, probably built for the Royal Meath Militia.

The reformed militia settled into a routine of annual peacetime training, although this was suspended for the Irish Militia from 1866 to 1870 because of Fenian troubles. The regiments now had a large cadre of permanent staff (about 30) and a number of the officers were former Regulars. Around a third of the recruits and many young officers went on to join the Regular Army. The Militia Reserve introduced in 1867 consisted of present and former militiamen who undertook to serve overseas in case of war. They were called out in 1878 during the international crisis caused by the Russo-Turkish War.

== Cardwell and Childers Reforms ==
Under the 'Localisation of the Forces' scheme introduced by the Cardwell Reforms of 1872, militia regiments were brigaded with their local linked regular regiments. For the Meath Militia this was in Sub-District No 67 (Counties of Meath, Westmeath and Longford, and King's and Queen's Counties) in Dublin District of Irish Command:

- 100th (Prince of Wales's Royal Canadian) Regiment of Foot
- 109th (Bombay Infantry) Regiment of Foot
- Royal Longford Rifles
- King's County Rifles
- Queen's County Rifles
- Westmeath Rifles
- Royal Meath Militia
- No 67 Brigade Depot was formed in April 1873 at Birr, the King's County Militia's headquarters.

Although often referred to as brigades, the sub-districts were purely administrative organisations, but in a continuation of the Cardwell Reforms a mobilisation scheme began to appear in the Army List from December 1875. This assigned regular and militia units to places in an order of battle for the 'Active Army' or the 'Garrison Army', even though these formations were entirely theoretical, with no staff or services assigned. The Meath Militia was assigned to the Garrison Army manning a range of small forts and posts across Ireland.

=== 5th Battalion, Leinster Regiment ===
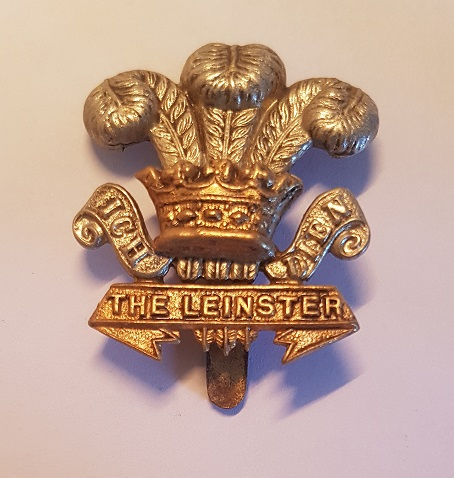
Prince of Wales's Leinster Regiment cap badge.

The Childers Reforms took Cardwell's reforms further, with the linked battalions forming single regiments. From 1 July 1881 the 100th and 109th Regiments became the 1st and 2nd Battalions of the Prince of Wales's Leinster Regiment (Royal Canadians), and three of the militia battalions followed in numerical sequence. The Royal Meath Militia became the 5th (Royal Meath Militia) Battalion, the King's County became the 3rd Bn and the Queen's County became the 4th Bn (the Longford Rifles and Westmeath joined the Rifle Brigade).

In 1898 the 5th Bn took part in the army manoeuvres on Salisbury Plain.

=== Second Boer War ===
After the Second Boer War broke out in October 1899 an expeditionary force was sent to South Africa and the militia reserve was called out to reinforce it. Later the militia regiments began to be embodied to replace the regulars for home defence. The 5th Leinsters were embodied on 2 May 1900 and served at Aldershot. The battalion was disembodied on 19 October that year.

== Special Reserve ==
After the Boer War, the future of the militia was called into question. There were moves to reform the Auxiliary Forces (Militia, Yeomanry and Volunteers) to take their place in the six Army Corps proposed by the Secretary of State for War, St John Brodrick. However, little of Brodrick's scheme was carried out. Under the more sweeping Haldane Reforms of 1908, the Militia was replaced by the Special Reserve (SR), a semi-professional force whose role was to provide reinforcement drafts for regular units serving overseas in wartime, rather like the earlier Militia Reserve. The battalion transferred to the SR as the 5th (Extra Reserve) Battalion of the Leinsters, while the 3rd (King's County Militia) and 4th (Queen's County Militia) Bns became Reserve and Extra Reserve Bns respectively. The possibility was held out that Extra Reserve battalions might be sent overseas in the event of war.

In the years leading up to World War I the battalion added a machine gun, cyclist and semaphore signalling sections. On the outbreak of war half of the eight company commanders had served at least eight years in the Regular Army. It oved its HQ from Navan to the larger town of Drogheda on the Co Meath–Co Louth border.

=== World War I ===
5th (ER) Battalion carried out its annual training during June 1914. The UK declared war on 4 August 1914 and the order to mobilise arrived at 18.52 on 4 August. Next morning an advance party left for the battalion's war station at Shanbally Camp at Monkstown, County Cork, the whole battalion arriving by 7 August, with a strength of 667. There it was brigaded with the 3rd (R) and 4th (ER) Bns of the Leinsters and other SR battalions as 'Shanbally Sub-Command' under Lt-Col Sir Anthony Weldon, the CO of 4th Bn. Training was hampered by the demands placed on the battalions for working parties to dig extensive trenches round the naval base of Queenstown and for guard duties. Soon after mobilisation the 5th Bn's CO, Lt-Col E.F. Farrell, went sick, and was temporarily replaced by Maj E.J. Jameson until the end of the year.

On 8 October the Special Reserve battalions were ordered to form service battalions from their surplus recruits, and 5th (Extra Reserve) Bn should have formed a 10th (Service) Battalion. However this order was cancelled for most Irish regiments and Extra Reserve battalions on 25 October and no 10th Bn was ever formed. Also on 25 October the 5th ER battalion was ordered to send a draft of 130 other ranks to the 2nd Leinsters, which had suffered heavy casualties at Prémesques during the Battle of Armentières. A second 40-strong draft followed in December. This confirmed that 5th (ER) battalion would not go overseas as a formed unit, but would spend the rest of the war as a draft-finding battalion.

5th Leinsters moved from Shanbally Camp to Passage West on 29 October and remained there until 21 May 1915, when the 4th and 5th battalions were ordered to England, embarking at Queenstown aboard the RMS Connaught for Plymouth. Here the 5th went into Renney Camp and became part of the Plymouth Garrison. However, a month later it returned to Ireland, arriving at Mullingar on 28 June. There it later formed part of 25th Irish Reserve Brigade. Despite the drafts sent out, the battalion only received four recruits between December 1914 and June 1915. However, it carried out recruiting tours across the battalion's areas in October–December 1915, restoring its strength from 230 to 846 all ranks by the end of the year.

=== Easter Rising ===
On 20 April 1916 the battalion (less a rear party left at Mullingar) moved to the Curragh, where it went into Gough Barracks. Four days later the Easter Rising broke out in Dublin. At 11.15 5th Battalion was ordered to send every available man to Dublin, and a service detachment of trained men (262 all ranks) entrained at 01.15 on 25 April, arriving at Kingsbridge Station and marching to Dublin Castle. At 14.00 the officer in command (OC) was ordered to clear the sector from Tara Street to Westmoreland Street. The leading platoon came under sharp fire as it passed the Lower Castle yard gate, but dealt with the snipers and occupied Dame Lane. Next day the battalion passed through Trinity College and occupied the south side of Dame Street with a picquet line, with a support party in Jammet Restaurant in St Andrew's Street. Next day (26 April) the OC received word that Tara St had been occupied and he was to complete the clearance to Westmoreland St. This was completed under continuous sniper fire by 13.00. The rebels had occupied Kelly's sporting ammunition shop, which commanded O'Connell Bridge: an artillery piece was brought up to shell this building, rendering it untenable, after which the 5th Bn detachment occupied College Street–D'Olier Street–Westmoreland Street, with the machine guns posted on top of the Tivoli Theatre and Trinity College. At 18.00 the battalion handed over to the 8th Reserve Cavalry Regiment, but retained and reinforced the Dame Street picquet.

On 27 April the 5th Battalion marched to the Castle at 09.00 and was soon ordered to occupy Parliament Street and Capel Street in conjunction with armoured cars and reinforced by a company of 3rd (Reserve) Bn, Royal Irish Rifles and another from 2/6th Bn, Sherwood Foresters, a Territorial Force unit rushed over from England. The force erected barricades, the 5th Bn occupying those in Little Britain Street, Little Mary Street, Lower Ormond Quay, Great Strand Street and Upper Abbey Street on the north side of the River Liffey. During the day the battalion assisted a party of Lancers bringing up ammunition, which had been held up by fire from the nearby Four Courts. By 29 April the 5th Bn had pushed forward to Liffey Street, and held that line until it was withdrawn on 1 May after the surrender of the insurgents. During the operations the battalion had lost one man killed and fie wounded. The rear party at Mullingar had operated with the advance party of the 4th (ER) Bn, Royal Dublin Fusiliers, in moving ammunition to Athlone. Afterwards it rejoined the main body of the battalion at the Curragh on 3 May.

Training was resumed at the Curragh, and the battalion undertook another recruiting drive with the pipes and drums through County Meath in September 1916. Lieutenant-Col Farrell was retired on grounds of ill-health at the end of November and replaced by Maj John McDonnell. By 21 May 1917 5th Bn had sent 1220 men to various overseas fronts (or 1658 if returning wounded are counted), and its strength was down to 280. In June it moved from Gough Barracks to tents at Mosney Camp in Co Meath. In August it moved again, to dilapidated barracks at Boyle, County Roscommon, a Nationalist area where trouble was expected but did not materialise. However, the political pressure on Irish battalions in Ireland following the Easter Rising was such that in November 1917 they were all moved to mainland UK. 5th Leinsters going to Glencorse Barracks in Scotland.

The losses incurred during the German spring offensive of March 1918 led to increased demands for drafts from the training battalions, which became very depleted. On 25 May the 5th (ER) Bn from Glencorse, together with the 4th (ER) Bn (the old Queen's County Militia) at Dover, were closed down and their remaining personnel transferred to 3rd (R) Bn at Portsmouth. That battalion continued preparing drafts until the end of the war in November 1918.

== Disbandment ==
With the establishment of the Irish Free State in 1922, all British Army regiments based in Southern Ireland were disbanded, including the Prince of Wales's Own Leinsters. The 5th (Extra Reserve) Battalion was consequently disbanded on 31 July 1922.

== Commanders ==
=== Colonels ===
Colonels of the Regiment included:

- Thomas Taylour, 1st Marquess of Headfort, 25 April 1793
- Thomas Taylour, 2nd Marquess of Headfort, 7 April 1823

=== Lieutenant-Colonels ===
Lieutenant-colonels (commandants after 1852) included:

- Thomas Pepper, 14 June 1799
- Thomas Edward Taylor, MP, 12 December 1846
- Sir John Dillon, 6th Baronet, former captain, 32nd Foot, appointed as major 13 November 1854, promoted 24 June 1871
- Hon Hercules Langford Rowley, former captain, 6th (Inniskilling) Dragoons, commissioned as major 11 July 1859, promoted 11 August 1875
- Henry Stuart Johnston, promoted 8 November 1890
- Charles Pepper, first commissioned as lieutenant 13 February 1871, promoted Lt-Col 28 October 1896
- Nugent Everard, first commissioned as supernumerary lieutenant 13 February 1871, promoted Lt-Col 23 November 1901, (honorary rank of colonel from 2 August 1902)
- Richard Taylor Woods, promoted 20 July 1906
- Edward F. Farrell, promoted 10 July 1912, retired November 1916
- John McDonnell, promoted November 1916

=== Honorary colonels ===
The following served as Honorary Colonel of the battalion:

- Thomas Taylour, 2nd Marquess of Headfort, died 1870
- General Francis Conyngham, 2nd Marquess Conyngham, appointed 20 December 1870, died 1876
- Thomas Taylour, 3rd Marquess of Headfort, appointed 16 December 1876
- Hon Hercules Langford Rowley, former CO, appointed 25 October 1890
- Charles Pepper, former CO, appointed 16 April 1904, re-appointed to SR 12 July 1908

=== Other notable officers ===
- Sir John Fox Dillon, 7th Baronet, commissioned as captain 11 July1871, later promoted major
- Lt-Col E.J. Jameson, DSO, former acting CO, killed in action commanding a battalion of the Essex Regiment at the First Battle of Gaza
- Hon Hubert A.J. Preston, MC, served in World War I, staff captain 1918

== Heritage & ceremonial ==
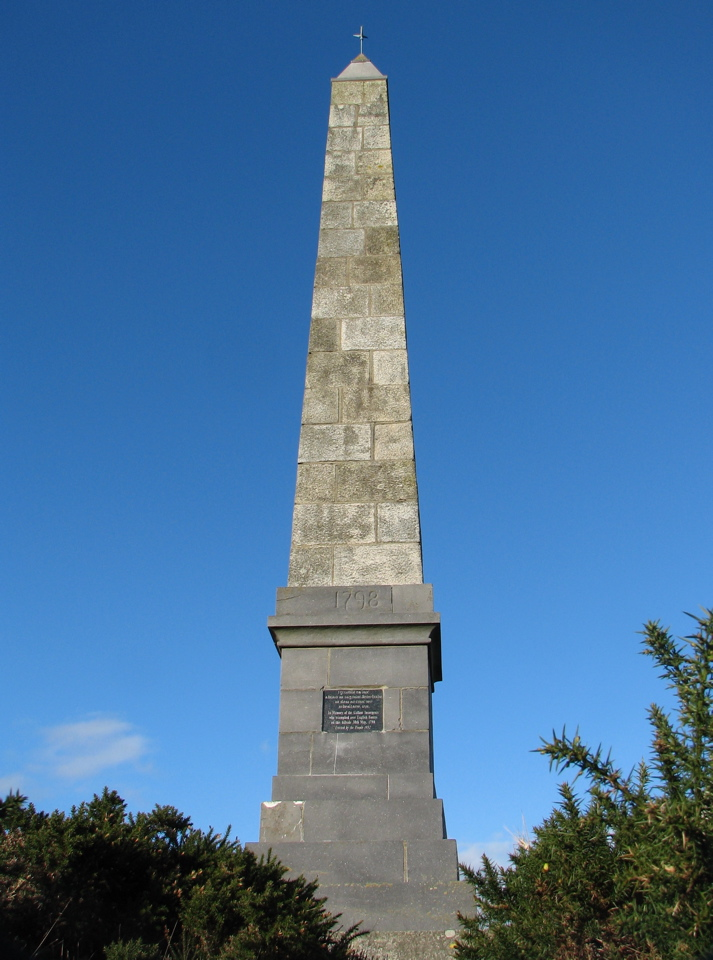
Three Rocks Monument.

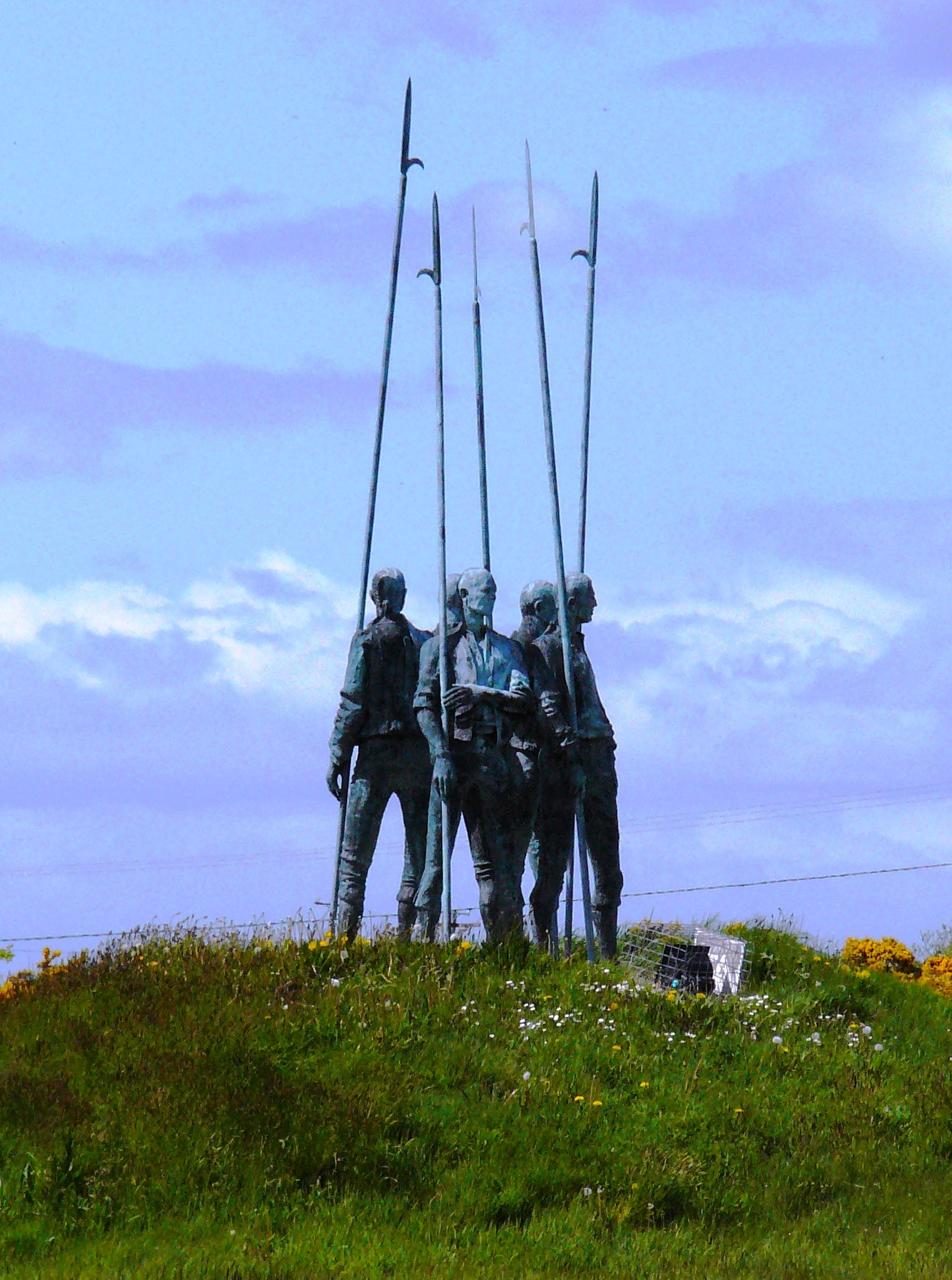
The Wexford Pikemen Monument.

=== Uniform & insignia ===
The uniform of the Royal Meath Militia was a red coat with the blue facings appropriate to a royal regiment.

The pre-1881 badge was an ornate Celtic brooch with a crown above. After 1881 the battalion adopted the insignia of the Leinster Regiment.

=== Precedence ===
On the outbreak of the French Revolutionary War the English counties had drawn lots to determine the relative precedence of their militia regiments. In 1798 the new Irish militia regiments received their own table of precedence, in which County Meath came 17th. In 1833 King William IV drew the lots to determine an order of precedence for the whole of the United Kingdom. Those regiments raised before 1783 took the first 69 places, followed by the 60 regiments (including those in Ireland) raised for the French Revolutionary War: the Royal Meath took 119th place, and this remained unchanged when the list was updated in 1855. Most regiments took little notice of the numeral.

=== Memorials ===
There are two memorials to the Battle of Three Rocks on 30 May 1798. An obelisk was erected at Forth Mountain in 1952, and in 1998 a group of bronze United Irish pikemen sculpted by Éamonn O'Doherty was placed by the road where the Royal Meath Militia were ambushed.

== See also ==
- Irish Militia
- Militia (United Kingdom)
- Special Reserve
- Prince of Wales's Leinster Regiment (Royal Canadians)
