= 3rd Bombay European Regiment =

- Active: 1858–1862
- Country: British India
- Branch: HEIC Army
- Type: Infantry
- Size: ~800 men all ranks in 1853
- Garrison/HQ: Pune
- Nickname: The Brassheads
- Engagements: Indian Rebellion of 1857; Central India Campaign; Battle of The Betwa; Siege of Jhansi

The 3rd Bombay European Regiment was an infantry regiment raised by the British East India Company in 1853. They were created originally for the defence of Bombay (Mumbai) and were stationed initially in Pune, but they were soon called upon to quell the Indian Rebellion of 1857.

They were deployed to Central India and were part of the 2nd Brigade of the Central India Field Force. They were instrumental in Sir Hugh Rose’s Central India Campaign of 1858, participating in the siege and recapture of strongholds captured by the rebels such as Sagar, Rahatgarh, Jhansi and Gwalior. They received two battle honours for this particular campaign.

After the rebellion was quelled, the British Parliament passed the Government of India Act 1858, which transferred power from the British East India Company to the British Crown. Wide-ranging reforms emanated from this act. The 3rd Bombay European Regiment was disbanded in 1862 and incorporated into the British Army as the 109th Regiment of Foot.

== Formation ==
Bombay (now Mumbai) was one of the islands that came to Britain as part of the marriage agreement between King Charles II and Catherine of Braganza, the daughter of the King of Portugal, John IV. To undertake the defence of Bombay, King Charles II created the Bombay Regiment of Europeans in 1662. In 1668, Bombay was ceded to the East India Company and along with it the regiment, creating the Bombay Army of the East India Company that was in effect on loan from the Crown. Between 1796 and 1798 this army was twice reorganized, becoming a formidable force. The Bombay Army by 1808 had grown to a strength of 26,500, comprising 6,500 British troops and 20,000 local troops. In this early part of the 19th century locally raised cavalry also increased the effectiveness of the Bombay Regiment. The officers of the Bombay Army were trained at Addiscombe Military Seminary, England, or recruited from direct appointment. In 1853 the East India Company further increased the size of the force and created the third infantry regiment on 15 November 1853. The 3rd Bombay European Regiment was initially stationed in Poona (Pune), a popular destination for Europeans in the rainy season and very popular with the troops. However, the relative peace they acquired was broken by the Indian Rebellion of 1857.

== Rahatgarh ==
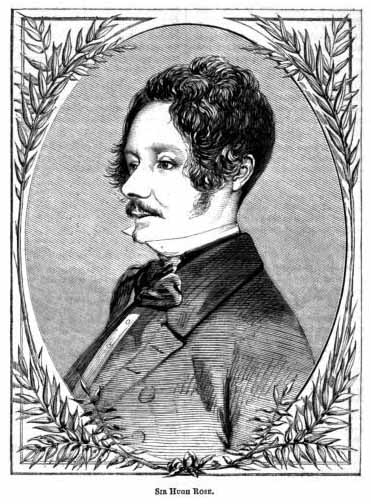
Hugh Rose commanded the Central India Field Force to capture Rahatgarh, Garhakota, Jhansi and Gwalior

As part of the Central India Field Force, 2nd Brigade, the 3rd Bombay Regiment departed Poona on 1 October 1857 with the objective of capturing the rebel stronghold of Jhansi. For the early part of the campaign, the 3rd Bombay Regiment spent their time at Sehore before moving on in January 1858 to Bhopal and then to Rahatgarh. On 26 January 1858, the 3rd Bombay Europeans commenced the preparation for the siege by helping with the placement of the artillery in difficult terrain. Following severe bombardment of the fort, on 28 January, the 3rd Bombay Europeans ignored the direct order of the commanding officer and were the first troops to enter the besieged fort. They discovered that their 500 strong enemy had escaped, but before doing so had inflicted atrocious injuries on the European women who had been caught up in the siege.

On 30 January, Sir Hugh Rose led a detachment of the 2nd Brigade, including the 3rd Bombay Europeans in pursuit of their enemy who were routed at the River Beena by the 3rd Bombay Europeans. The 3rd Bombay Europeans charged and drove the enemy out of the thick jungle. This was quickly followed by the 3rd Bombay Europeans occupying the fort at Barodia. In his report back to England, Sir Hugh Rose singled out the 3rd Bombay Europeans and their C.O. Lt. Col. Liddell for praise. 5 men of the 3rd Europeans were injured in the engagement.

== Garhakota ==
By 9 February, the 3rd Bombay Europeans were once more heading for action as part of the force to attack Garhakota. Once they had pitched camp near the fort, the enemy started a bombardment of round shot and rockets. The rebel sepoys of the 51st and 52nd Bengal regiments advanced in force towards the guns of the horse artillery but were beaten back twice by the 3rd Bombay Europeans and eventually retreated into their fort. The fort was then continuously bombarded by heavy shells and eventually on 13 February, Sir Hugh Rose's force was successful in causing the sepoys to abandon the fort, which was entered by the 3rd Bombay Europeans early in the morning.

Having been successful with the capture of Garhakota, the 3rd Bombay European Regiment returned to rejoin the 2nd Brigade at Sagar on 17 February, to recuperate before the next phase of the progress toward the rebel stronghold of Jhansi. During this period of rest, the 3rd Bombay European Regiment were permitted to experiment with a new battle uniform to replace the traditional heavy red and blue uniform typically worn by them. This new battle uniform was developed by the regiment itself to create stone-coloured cotton shirts and trousers. This was possibly the first time any British unit was permitted to wear a khaki uniform. The experiment was deemed to have worked as the 3rd Bombay European Regiment became known as the "Brassheads" in recognition of their ability to withstand the high temperatures of India. Respite was however short and by late February, the 3rd Bombay European Regiment moved north with the 2nd Brigade towards Jhansi. Three more obstacles faced the 2nd Brigade before Jhansi, these being the stronghold of Narut and the passes Mundinpur and Malthon.

At the pass of Mundinpur, the enemy opened fire on the 2nd Brigade from the hills on both sides of the pass. The 3rd Bombay European Regiment and the Hyderabad Contingent drew the attack and attempted to clear the hills of the enemy. They charged into the jungle while the artillery opened fire on the rebels beating them back from the hills and through the pass. Following a brief respite, the 2nd Brigade continued on their route to Banpore and thence to the river Betwa.

== Jhansi ==
On 21 March, the 2nd Brigade, including the 3rd Bombay European Regiment, was before the formidable city of Jhansi. The defences of Jhansi and its fort were reported to look impregnable and the battle plan involved taking the city prior to an attack on the fort. Preparations for a bombardment took place during the 24–25 March and the action commenced on 25 March 1858. The enemy too kept up their matchlock and round shot fire. The 1st Brigade arrived at Jhansi on the 25th and their artillery added to the bombardment which lasted eight days. Progress was made, with much of the defences of the city and the fort in poor shape as a result of the combined bombardment, but the logistics of battle were kicking in and the continued availability of ammunition was becoming critical. On 31 March, a force of 20,000 troops of the enemy was reported to be making their way to attack the British and relieve the city.

=== Battle of the Betwa ===
With the capture of Jhansi previously looking imminent, Sir Hugh Rose then concluded that the relieving 20,000 strong force commanded by Tantia Tope combined with the 11,000 still in the city and fort would outnumber his own force. Rose had little option but to now defend his position on two fronts. A force of 1200 troops was assembled, which included 226 men of the 3rd Bombay European Regiment, who now faced the relieving force. At dawn, a single line of the 3rd Bombay European Regiment together with the 24th Bombay Native Infantry faced the advancing army of Tantia Tope. Rose however, had planned well and each flank of the line had in place field artillery that moved into position to provide cross-fire into the advancing force. With Tantia Tope caught off-balance, Rose ordered the 14th Light Dragoons to charge on both flanks and himself rode leading the left flank cavalry attack. As Tantia Tope's forces reeled under the cavalry, the 86th Regiment and the 24th Bombay Native Infantry advanced to complete the rout. The 3rd Bombay European Regiment fought on and by the evening, although with vastly superior numbers, the forces of Tantia Tope was beaten and dispersed with fatal casualties exceeding one thousand men. Total British losses were fifteen killed in action, of which two were from the 3rd Bombay European Regiment and sixty-six wounded including three from the 3rd Bombay European Regiment.

=== The siege of Jhansi resumes ===
With the relieving force dispensed with, the capture of the fort resumed. On 3 April the 3rd Bombay European Regiment moved into position to attack the city wall on either side of the Orcha Gate. Two attacking formations of one hundred men each, the left column led by Captain Robison, 3rd Bombay European Regiment, the right by Lieutenant-Colonel Liddell, advanced with great steadiness through a very heavy fire of musketry and wall pieces towards the ladders, on reaching which they were assailed with rockets, earthen pots filled with powder and various projectiles. But a serious miscalculation had occurred – the ladders used by the 3rd Europeans were found in some instances too short, in others too weak, breaking under the men. The regiment came under heavy fire, who despite some minor success in scaling the walls with many acts of gallantry and being reinforced by another 100 men of the 3rd Bombay European Regiment, was eventually forced to retire. A parallel attack on the left flank of the fort by the 86th Regiment succeeded in breaching the wall and a party from the 3rd Bombay European Regiment led by Captain Robison followed the 86th through the breach. Lt. Col. Liddell, on finding his ladders of no use, ordered Lt. Goodfellow, Bombay Engineers, to try a bag of powder at a postern but no entry could be effected. By the time, Captain Robison had made good his lodgment, and was followed by the right column. Pushing on for the Palace, the 3rd Bombay European Regiment were engaged in difficult street fighting until the Palace was reached and jointly captured by the 3rd Bombay European Regiment and 86th Regiment, though both regiments suffered casualties when the enemy ignited a powder room causing an explosion.

Although the Palace was taken, the battle was not yet over. A detachment from the 3rd Bombay Regiment was sent to overcome the Afghan troopers who were bodyguards of Rani Laxmibai and although the Afghans inflicted significant casualties on the regiment, they were eventually all disposed of and the standard of the Rani was retrieved. An English Union Flag of silk was also retrieved. Lord William Bentinck had given it to the grandfather of the husband of the Rani, with the permission to have it carried before him, as a reward for his fidelity-a privilege granted to no other Indian prince. The soldiers were allowed to hoist the flag on the place. The fighting in the city continued for a further day culminating in Lieutenant Baigrie of the 3rd Bombay European Regiment announcing that he had entered an abandoned fort, and so the fall of Jhansi was claimed. Described as a significant tactical victory, the toll on the regiment was 7 killed in action and 52 wounded.

== Lohari ==
With the fall of Jhansi behind them the 3rd Bombay European Regiment, still part of the Central India Field Force, were divided. Part of the regiment was left in charge of the fortress at Jhansi under the command of Lt. Col Liddell whilst the remainder marched with Sir Hugh Rose in his pursuit of Tantia Tope.

Sir Hugh Rose, on arriving at Poonch, sent Major Gall to the fort at Lohari. The fort and village of Lohari were situated in an extensive level plain. The fort itself was square and flanked by round towers at the corners. It had a ditch and a second line of works outside the ditch. A company of the 3rd Europeans crossed the open space between the village and fort without opposition and established themselves in a guard-house close to the ditch. The garrison of the fort paid no heed to the summons of surrender. Major Gall concluded that no option remained, after reconnaissance, but to open the third gate with a bag of gunpowder and carry the fort by storm. Twenty-five files of the 3rd Europeans, under Lieutenants Armstrong and Donne and Ensign Newport occupied the gateways as the storming party. Lieutenant Bonus, Bombay Engineers, under the cover of sharp fire from the 3rd Europeans, placed the powder-bag in front of the closed gate, and the firing party withdrew. The explosion occurred and the storming 3rd Europeans rushed in through the smoke and almost immediately met the enemy face to face. The stormers were assailed by a shower of stones and brickbats as well as by men who cut, stabbed and shot at them from the walls. Lieutenant Donne and Ensign Newport were severely wounded while fighting hand-to-hand, but beat off their assailants and retreated under bayonet protection. Lieutenant Rose now came opportunely to the front for a final charge and the 3rd Europeans, with some of the 25th Bombay Native Infantry, drove their foe before them and a bloody melee ensued. A last stand by the foe near the gateway was also crushed. The bugler private, Private Whirlpool, who made it through the gate first in the final charge, later received the Victoria Cross for his gallantry. The 3rd Bombay Europeans had a toll of 1 killed in action and 17 wounded.

== Konch to Kalpi ==
On 7 May, the 3rd Bombay European Regiment marched off for Konch and thence to Kalpi. This involved marching over 20 miles (32 km) with full kit in temperatures exceeding 117 °F (65 °C), and in such temperatures there were many casualties due to heat exhaustion, for amongst all the units in the force, only the 3rd Bombay European Regiment marched in lightweight khaki cotton; the rest were in heavy duty red. In the operations before Kalpi, Lieutenant Baigrie, Ensign Mackintosh and Ensign Trueman of the 3rd Bombay Europeans were mentioned in dispatches for their gallantry in action. Captain Forrest of the 3rd European was also commended for his actions in the capture of the village of Sonorie in December 1858, commanding his troops in fighting against the enemy who used their knowledge of the terrain effectively.

On 14 January 1858, near the village of Dewsa, the 3rd Europeans assisted Brigadier Showers in catching up with the enemy force, commanded by Tantia Tope. The cavalry was able to disperse the enemy in separate directions. They kept up the chase, marching for 5 miles (8.0 km), before it was halted out of exhaustion.

The fighting that took place at Kalpi was ferocious with the heat inflicting as many casualties as their foe. Tantia Tope's army attacked the British and at one stage Rose again led from the front as the 86th, the 3rd Europeans and the 25th Native Infantry advanced in the hand-to-hand fighting. The temperature was now recorded as 118 °F (66 °C) in the shade and all the officers of the Central India Field Force were suffering severe effects of the sun. Yet the regiment carried on and in the victory of Kalpi, the 3rd Bombay European Regiment contributed much in battle.

Yet Tantia Tope's army refused to admit defeat. Bolstered by the Rani of Jhansi and her escape from Jhansi, Tantia Tope had captured Gwalior. Whilst Rose once more took his force off to recapture Gwalior he did so without the 3rd Bombay European Regiment who were initially left to garrison Kalpi, and by the time they arrived at Gwalior on 18 June, the order of battle did not require them in the front line. At Gwalior, the Rani of Jhansi was killed in action and it was not until April 1859 that Tantia Tope was executed.

== Post-rebellion and disbandment ==
The Indian Mutiny was over and in May 1859, the 3rd Bombay European Regiment moved to Mhow, where they learned that the Crown had assumed responsibility of the HEIC and its armies. They were given the choice of either submitting to the Queen's service or be returned to England. The men of the regiment declined the offer to re-enlist and were sent back to England. In 1862, the regiment was joined by 500 men of the Jaeger Corps who had volunteered from the Cape Colony for service in India on the outbreak of the Indian Mutiny. In 1862, on the amalgamation of British and HEIC forces, the 3rd Europeans and the Jaeger Corps were incorporated into the British Army as the 109th Regiment of Foot in Karachi. The formal ceremony took place on 30 July 1862 with a strength of 770 troops commanded by Lt. Col. C.S. Whitehall (former 3rd European). On 3 September 1863, the 109th Regiment of Foot were awarded with the battle honour "Central India" in recognition for their contribution as the 3rd Bombay European Regiment. On 1 July 1881, as part of the Cardwell Reforms of the British Army, the 109th became the 2nd Battalion, The Prince of Wales's Leinster Regiment (Royal Canadians).
