= Crinkill =

Crinkill Críonchoill
- Village
- Location within Ireland
- Coordinates: 53.0800°N 7.8985°W
- Country: Ireland
- Province: Leinster
- County: County Offaly

Population (2016)
  - Total: 682

Crinkill (Irish: Críonchoill), sometimes spelt Crinkle, is a village in County Offaly, Ireland, close to Birr. Crinkill was designated as a census town by the Central Statistics Office for the first time in the 2016 census, at which time it had a population of 682 people.

== History ==
The village originally grew up around a British Army military barracks, Birr Barracks, which was constructed around 1805. However, the barracks was abandoned by the British army around the time of Irish independence, and was burnt down in July 1922 as a result of the civil war that followed. Today only the ruins of the outer wall remain. In 2013, the Regimental Association of the Prince of Wales's Leinster Regiment (Royal Canadians) erected a memorial to commemorate the regiment's strong linkages with the area.

== Features ==
The Thatch, a 200-year-old thatched restaurant and bar in the center of Crinkill, has been in the same family ownership for nearly 300 years. The Thatch has won several awards, including the Offaly Pub of the Year and the All Ireland Pub Of The Year in 1999 and 2001.

== Education ==
Crinkill National School is the local national (primary) school.

== Sport ==
The village is home to Crinkill GAA and Handball Club. Together with neighbouring clubs Carrig and Riverstown the club fields teams at all levels in the name of CRC Gaels. Kevin Breen, a member of the East Tennessee State University cross country team known as the Irish Brigade, is a native of Crinkle. Breen was member of the ETSU team that placed second in the 1972 NCAA Division One cross country championships in Houston, Texas. He competed for Tullamore Harriers and has won Irish National Track championships medals.
