= Martin Moffat =

Martin Joseph Moffat VC
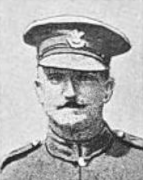
- Born: 15 April 1882; Sligo, County Sligo, Ireland
- Died: 5 January 1946 (aged 63); County Sligo, Ireland
- Burial place: Sligo Town Cemetery, County Sligo
- Military career
- Allegiance: United Kingdom
- Branch: British Army
- Rank: Private
- Units: Connaught Rangers; Prince of Wales's Leinster Regiment
- Conflicts: World War I: Western Front
- Awards: Victoria Cross; Croix de Guerre (Belgium)

Martin Joseph Moffat VC (15 April 1882 – 5 January 1946) was an Irish recipient of the Victoria Cross, the highest and most prestigious award for gallantry in the face of the enemy that can be awarded to British and Commonwealth forces.

== Details ==
He answered the call to enlist for the duration of the war as a "Kitchener Recruit" in a "New Army" battalion of the Connaught Rangers.

He was a 34 year old private in the 2nd Battalion, Prince of Wales's Leinster Regiment, British Army during the First World War when the following deed took place for which he was awarded the VC.

On 14 October 1918 near Ledeghem, Belgium, Private Moffat was advancing with five others across the open when they suddenly came under heavy rifle fire at close range from a strongly held house. Rushing towards the house through a hail of bullets, Private Moffat threw bombs and then, working to the back of the house, rushed the door, killing two and capturing 30 of the enemy.

He was also awarded the Croix de Guerre and the Military Decoration by Belgium. His VC and other medals are on display at the Lord Ashcroft VC Gallery in the Imperial War Museum, London. Copies of his medals and a photograph are on display in Sligo County Museum, Stephen Street, Sligo.
