= Frederick Whirlpool =

- Born: Humphrey James; 17 July 1831; Dundalk, Ireland
- Died: 24 June 1899 (aged 67); New South Wales, Australia
- Burial place: Presbyterian Cemetery, Windsor
- Military career
- Allegiance: United Kingdom
- Branch: Bengal Army
- Rank: Private
- Units: 3rd Bombay European Regiment
- Conflicts: Indian Mutiny
- Awards: Victoria Cross

Frederick Whirlpool, VC (17 July 1831 – 24 June 1899) was an English soldier and a recipient of the Victoria Cross (VC) during the Indian Mutiny. The Victoria Cross is the highest award for gallantry in the face of the enemy that can be awarded to British and Commonwealth forces. In his later life, Whirlpool migrated to Australia; as a result, he is sometimes claimed as an Australian VC recipient, although his name is not included in the official count.

== Early life and military career ==
For many years he was believed to have been born as "Frederick Conker" in Liverpool, in either 1829 or 1830, and some sources state that he was born in London. However, in his 2018 book Allen Leek provided evidence that he was born on 17 July 1831 in County Carlow, in Ireland. His early childhood, was spent in Ireland where he most probably attended the Dundalk Institute an Irish Protestant school. Upon completion of his education he found himself working as a clerk for the Dundalk Poor Law Union, a job that he hated. Following an argument with his father, he left Ireland to enlist in the army of the East India Company.

Upon enlistment he assumed the name of Frederick Whirlpool, which he later explained was due to his father's characterisation of his temper. He arrived in Bombay in 1855 and joined the 3rd Bombay European Regiment (later The Prince of Wales's Leinster Regiment). Although he was assigned the role of an assistant schoolmaster, in early April 1858, during the Indian Mutiny, Whirlpool's regiment was sent to Jhansi, to recapture it from mutineers who had taken it the previous year. Whirlpool subsequently found himself in the thick of the fighting.

Over the course of a month Whirlpool distinguished himself to his superiors on a number of occasions. The first instance came in early April when, during the fighting in Jhansi, braving heavy fire and at great personal risk he rescued two wounded men who had fallen in the open. Later, in May, during an assault on Lohari, he single-handedly defended a wounded subaltern who had fallen in the open and subsequently been surrounded by enemy soldiers. For his actions during this time, Whirlpool was nominated for the Victoria Cross, the British military's highest decoration for gallantry. The award was announced in the London Gazette on 21 October 1859, which stated the following:

For gallantly volunteering on the 3rd of April, 1858, in the attack of Jhansi, to return and carry away several killed and wounded, which he did twice under a very heavy fire from the wall; also, for devoted bravery at the Assault of Lohari on the 2nd of May, 1858, in rushing to the rescue of Lieutenant Doune, of the Regiment, who was dangerously wounded. In this service, Private Whirlpool received seventeen desperate wounds, one of which nearly severed his head from his body. The gallant example shown by this man is considered to have greatly contributed to the success of the day.

== Later life ==
After the action for which Whirlpool later received the Victoria Cross, he was hospitalised in Jhansi. Surviving despite considerable odds, he was considered too badly wounded to remain in the regiment and as a result was discharged before he could be presented with his award. He was granted a pension and later migrated to Australia. In 1859 he landed in Victoria and he began looking for work. He was employed briefly as a school teacher, and he applied unsuccessfully to join the police. Later he joined the Hawthorne and Kew Volunteer Rifles, assuming a different name. Eventually a drill instructor discovered who he was and in June 1861, in front of 2,000 people, in the uniform of his new regiment, Whirlpool reluctantly received his medal.

Later, after turning down a job offer to join the police, Whirlpool changed his name to Humphrey James and moved to Tasmania. By 1865, however, he had moved to Sydney. Keeping his identity secret, he undertook a teachers training course and then began working at a school near Wisemans Ferry. Still plagued by his injuries, and although considered to be a good teacher, he had a drinking problem, though for long periods a teetotaller, circumstances would have him lapse into a drinking binge, and this eventually led to him being dismissed from the state school system (he continued to teach in private schools and as a tutor).

Following this, Whirlpool became a "hermit" and moved to Windsor, although he continued to draw his pension. In the final part of his life, Whirlpool confided his true identity to a grocer called Smith, who allowed him to live on his property for a time and supported him by giving him free groceries. When Whirlpool died on 24 June 1899, Smith assumed the role of executor of Whirlpool's estate, arranging for him to be buried in a Presbyterian churchyard. Whirlpool had been so reclusive in his final years that Smith was the only attendee at the funeral.

== The medal ==
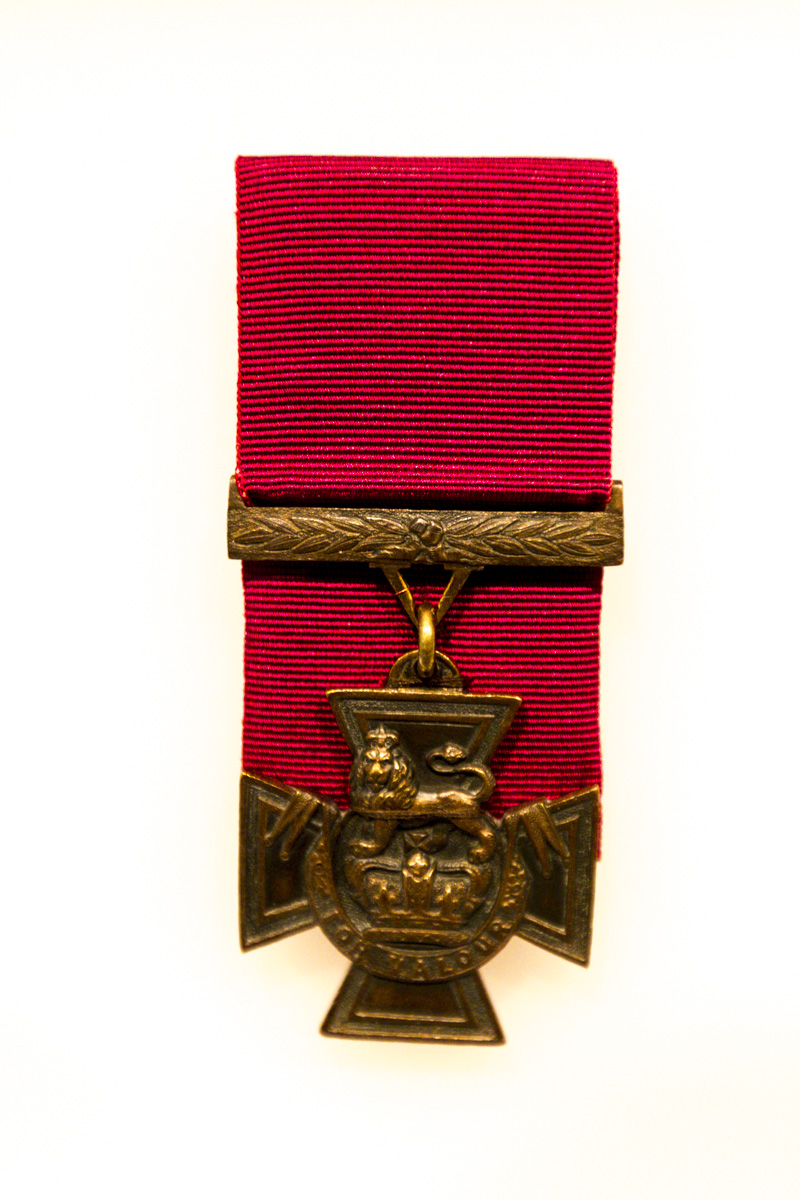
Whirlpool's Victoria Cross at the Australian War Memorial, Canberra

The presentation of Whirlpool's medal, on 20 June 1861, was the first public presentation in Australia of a Victoria Cross. The medal was presented to him by Lady Barkly, the wife of Sir Henry Barkly, the governor of Victoria at that time. His Victoria Cross is displayed at the Australian War Memorial (AWM) in Canberra, Australia.

The medal has not always been on display in the AWM, though, and the story of its acquisition is of itself indicative of the debate about Whirlpool's national identity and the reluctance of Australians to consider the role of the British in the nation's early military history. Where the medal went initially after Whirlpool's death is unknown. There is speculation that it might have been kept by Smith, or that Smith sent it to Whirlpool's brother in the United States; however, by the 1950s it was in the possession of a medal dealer in London. It was then purchased by Denys Croll, an Irish school teacher working in Australia. Croll subsequently offered to donate the medal to the AWM in the early 1960s but was turned down as it was initially felt that it did not belong in their collection because "Whirlpool wasn't Australian".

The Mitchell Library in Sydney offered to display it but Croll died before this could be affected. Croll's widow subsequently offered to loan the medal and in the mid-1960s one of the AWM's curators, Peter Burness, argued that Whirlpool was Australian and sought to acquire it for a new section of the memorial dedicated to Victoria Cross recipients. Nevertheless, the debate about the appropriate characterisation of Whirlpool's nationality continued to affect the way the award was presented in the memorial for a number of decades. This lasted until the mid-1980s when Whirlpool's integration into the story of Australia's pre-First World War military history seemingly came into acceptance when he was included in the second edition of Wigmore and Harding's They Dared Mightily, in which although he was not included in the official count of 96 Australian recipients he was characterised as an Australian recipient of the award, albeit one who had not served in the Australian forces and who had been born elsewhere.
