= John Vincent Holland =

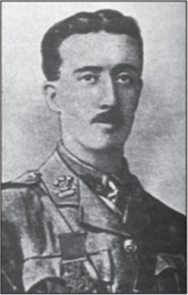
- Born: 19 July 1889; Athy, County Kildare, Ireland
- Died: 27 February 1975 (aged 85); Hobart, Tasmania, Australia
- Military career
- Allegiance: United Kingdom/British Empire
- Branch: British Army; British Indian Army
- Rank: Major
- Units: 3rd Battalion, Prince of Wales's Leinster Regiment
- Conflicts: World War I World War II
- Awards: Victoria Cross

Major John Vincent Holland VC (19 July 1889 – 27 February 1975), was World War I Irish soldier, and the recipient of the Victoria Cross, the highest award for gallantry in the face of the enemy that can be awarded to British and Commonwealth forces.

== Early life and education ==
Holland was born into a middle-class family in Athy, County Kildare, the son of veterinary surgeon John Holland and Catherine Peppard. He was educated first at Clongowes Wood College and later at Liverpool University, and was one of 600 Old Clongonians to enlist in the army during World War One.

== World War I ==
On the outbreak of war he enlisted in the 2nd Life Guards in November 1914 undergoing his training in Combermere Barracks at Windsor. After a short time with the Life Guards he was granted a commission with the 3rd (Reserve) Battalion, Prince of Wales's Leinster Regiment (Royal Canadians). In March 1915 he was attached to the 2nd Battalion of the Royal Dublin Fusiliers and was then wounded in August and returned to England and Ireland to convalesce, but it wasn't long until he was back in France and back with the 7th Battalion Leinster Regiment serving as battalion bombing officer.

On 3 September 1916, during the Somme Offensive, whilst engaged in intense combat in the vicinity of the village of Guillemont, Holland was awarded the Victoria Cross for the following action:

"During a heavy engagement, Lt. Holland, not content with bombing hostile dug-outs, fearlessly led his troops through our own artillery barrage and cleared a great part of the village in front. He started out with 26 troops and finished with only five after capturing some 50 prisoners. By this gallant action he undoubtedly broke the spirit of the enemy and saved many casualties."

Holland was subsequently promoted to Captain. During the war he was also Mentioned in Dispatches and received a personal "Hickie Parchment" from his Divisional General-Officer-Commanding, Major-General William Hickie, in recognition of his bravery in action.

== Later life ==
In 1917, Holland married Frances Grogan at the cathedral in Cork City. Together they had two sons: Major Niall V. Holland (d. 1944), who was killed in Burma during the Second World War and Norman J. Holland.

He was seconded for service with the Indian Army in the rank of Lt. 31 October 1919. On 13 November 1919 he was appointed on probation to the Indian Army as a Captain, an appointment that was confirmed on 27 November 1920. In September 1922 he retired from the army. At the outbreak of the Second World War, Holland again commissioned, serving as administrative officer of the 79th (Hertfordshire Yeomanry) Heavy Anti-Aircraft Regiment, Royal Artillery, then re-joined the Indian Army but was invalided out in 1941. He then took up a position with the Ministry of Food. In 1956, Holland and his wife emigrated to Hobart, in Tasmania.

== Death ==
Holland died in Hobart in February 1975 at the age of 85. His body was buried in Cornelian Bay Cemetery, with military honours. His wife, Frances, pre-deceased him, dying in 1960. Holland lived to see the birth of his great-grandchild.

== Tribute ==
On 3 September 2009 a memorial plaque was unveiled at Guillemont Church in France dedicated to the memory of the three soldiers who won Victoria Crosses in the fighting at the village during the Somme in 1916, Holland's name being one of the three.
