= William Homan =

Irish baronet

Sir William Jackson Homan, 1st Baronet (1771 – March 1852), was an Irish baronet.

Homan was the second son of the Reverend Philip Homan and grandson of George Homan, of Surrock, County Westmeath, by his wife Elizabeth Jackson, daughter and heiress of the Reverend William Jackson, of Maghul, Lancashire. He married Lady Charlotte Stuart, daughter of John Stuart, 1st Marquess of Bute, in 1797. In 1801 he was created a baronet, of Dunlum in the County of Westmeath. He acted as agent for the trustees of Dromana (where he also resided) for his brother-in-law Lord Henry Stuart and then his son, Henry, until 1847.

Homan died in March 1852. His only son had predeceased him and the title died with him.

Baronetage of the United Kingdom
New creation	Baronet (of Dunlum); 1801–1852	Extinct
Preceded by Dillon baronets	Homan baronets of Dunlum; 1 August 1801	Succeeded by Keane baronets
