= William Pollexfen Radcliffe =

British Army general

General Sir William Pollexfen Radcliffe KCB
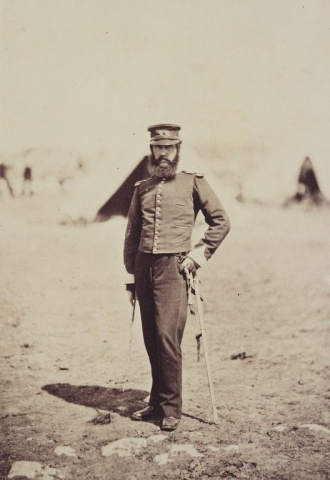
- Radcliffe as a major
- Born: 22 December 1822; Warleigh House, Devon
- Died: 23 March 1897 (aged 74); Mortimer Common, Berkshire
- Military career
- Allegiance: United Kingdom
- Branch: British Army
- Rank: General
- Commands: Eastern District
- Conflicts: Crimean War
- Awards: Knight Commander of the Order of the Bath

General Sir William Pollexfen Radcliffe KCB (22 December 1822 – 23 March 1897) was a British Army officer who became General Officer Commanding Eastern District.

== Military career ==
Radcliffe was commissioned as an ensign in the 20th Regiment of Foot on 12 March 1841. After serving in Bermuda and Canada, he fought at the Battle of Alma in September 1854, the Battle of Balaclava in October 1854 and the Battle of Inkerman in November 1854 as well as the Siege of Sevastopol during the Crimean War. He went on to be Inspector-General of Musketry of Hythe in January 1873 and General Officer Commanding Eastern District in October 1878. He was promoted full general on 1 April 1887.

He was also Colonel of the Royal Berkshire Regiment from 1891 to 1894, when he transferred to be Colonel of the Lancashire Fusiliers until his death.

Military offices
Preceded by Sir Richard Kelly	GOC Eastern District; 1878–1882	Succeeded by Sir Henry Clifford
