= Tylden, South Africa =

Tylden
- Location within Eastern Cape Location within South Africa
- Coordinates: 32.109°S 27.067°E
- Country: South Africa
- Province: Eastern Cape
- District: Chris Hani
- Municipality: Enoch Mgijima

Area
  - Total: 1.77 km^{2} (0.68 sq mi)

Population (2011)
  - Total: 572
  - Density: 323/km^{2} (837/sq mi)

Racial makeup (2011)
  - Black African: 87.6%
  - Coloured: 1.0%
  - White: 11.4%

First languages (2011)
  - Xhosa: 87.2%
  - English: 7.2%
  - Afrikaans: 4.7%
  - Other: 0.9%
- Time zone: UTC+2 (SAST)
- PO box: 5323

Tylden is a village in Chris Hani District Municipality in the Eastern Cape province of South Africa.

The village is 37 km south-east of Queenstown and 20 km north of Cathcart. It is administered by a village management board. It was named after Captain Tylden of the Royal Engineers, officer in charge of a campaign against the Tambookies (Tembus) in 1851.
