= Richard Kelly (British Army officer) =

British Army general

Lieutenant-General Sir Richard Kelly KCB
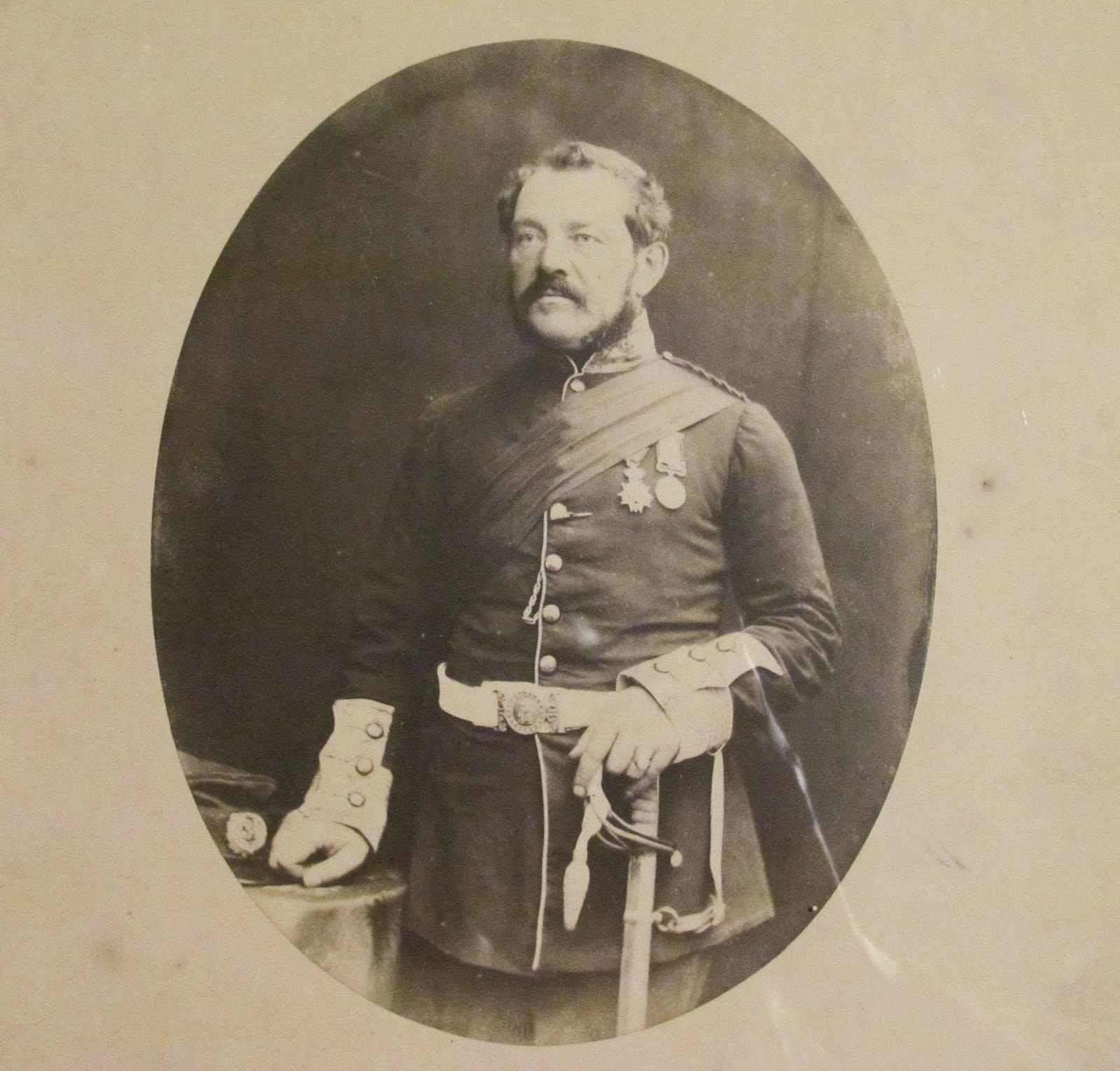
- Colonel Richard Kelly, c. 1855
- Born: 9 March 1815; Ceylon
- Died: 1897 (aged 81–82); Earley, Berkshire
- Burial place: St Peter's Churchyard, Earley
- Military career
- Allegiance: United Kingdom
- Branch: British Army
- Rank: Lieutenant-General
- Commands: Cork District; Eastern District
- Conflicts: Crimean War; Indian Rebellion
- Awards: Knight Commander of the Order of the Bath

Lieutenant-General Sir Richard Denis Kelly KCB (9 March 1815 – 1897) was a British Army officer who became General Officer Commanding Eastern District.

== Military career ==
Kelly was commissioned into the 49th (Royal Berkshire) Regiment of Foot in 1834. He became commanding officer of 34th (Cumberland) Regiment of Foot and, in that capacity, was wounded and taken prisoner at the Siege of Sevastopol during the Crimean War. He also took part in the Siege of Cawnpore in June 1857, the Siege of Lucknow in Autumn 1857 and the relief of Azimghur in April 1858 during the Indian Rebellion. He went on to be General Officer Commanding Cork District in April 1874 and General Officer Commanding Eastern District in April 1877.

He was also colonel of the Royal Irish Regiment from 1886 to 1889 and colonel of the Border Regiment from 1889 to his death in 1897.

He was buried at St Peter's Churchyard in Earley, Berkshire.

== Family ==
In 1848, Kelly married Ellen Susanna Dillon (18 December 1824 – 8 February 1903), daughter of Sir William Dillon, 4th baronet, of Lismullen, Co. Meath. Lady Kelly died at 52, Cheniston gardens, Kensington, on 8 February 1903.

Military offices
Preceded by Sir Edward Greathed	GOC Eastern District; 1877–1878	Succeeded by William Pollexfen Radcliffe
Preceded by Alexander MacDonnell	Colonel of the Royal Irish Regiment; 1886–1889	Succeeded by George Frederick Stevenson Call
Preceded by Alexander Maxwell	Colonel of the Border Regiment; 1889–1897	Succeeded by Sir Henry Charles Barnston Daubeney
