= 109th Regiment of Foot (Bombay Infantry) =

- Active: 1853–1881
- Country: East India Company (1853–1858); United Kingdom (1858–1881)
- Branch: Bombay Army (1853–1862); British Army (1862–1881)
- Type: Infantry
- Size: One battalion
- Garrison/HQ: Birr Barracks, Birr, County Offaly
- Engagements: Indian Rebellion

The 109th Regiment of Foot (Bombay Infantry) was an infantry regiment of the British Army from 1862 to 1881, when it was amalgamated into The Prince of Wales's Leinster Regiment (Royal Canadians).

== History ==
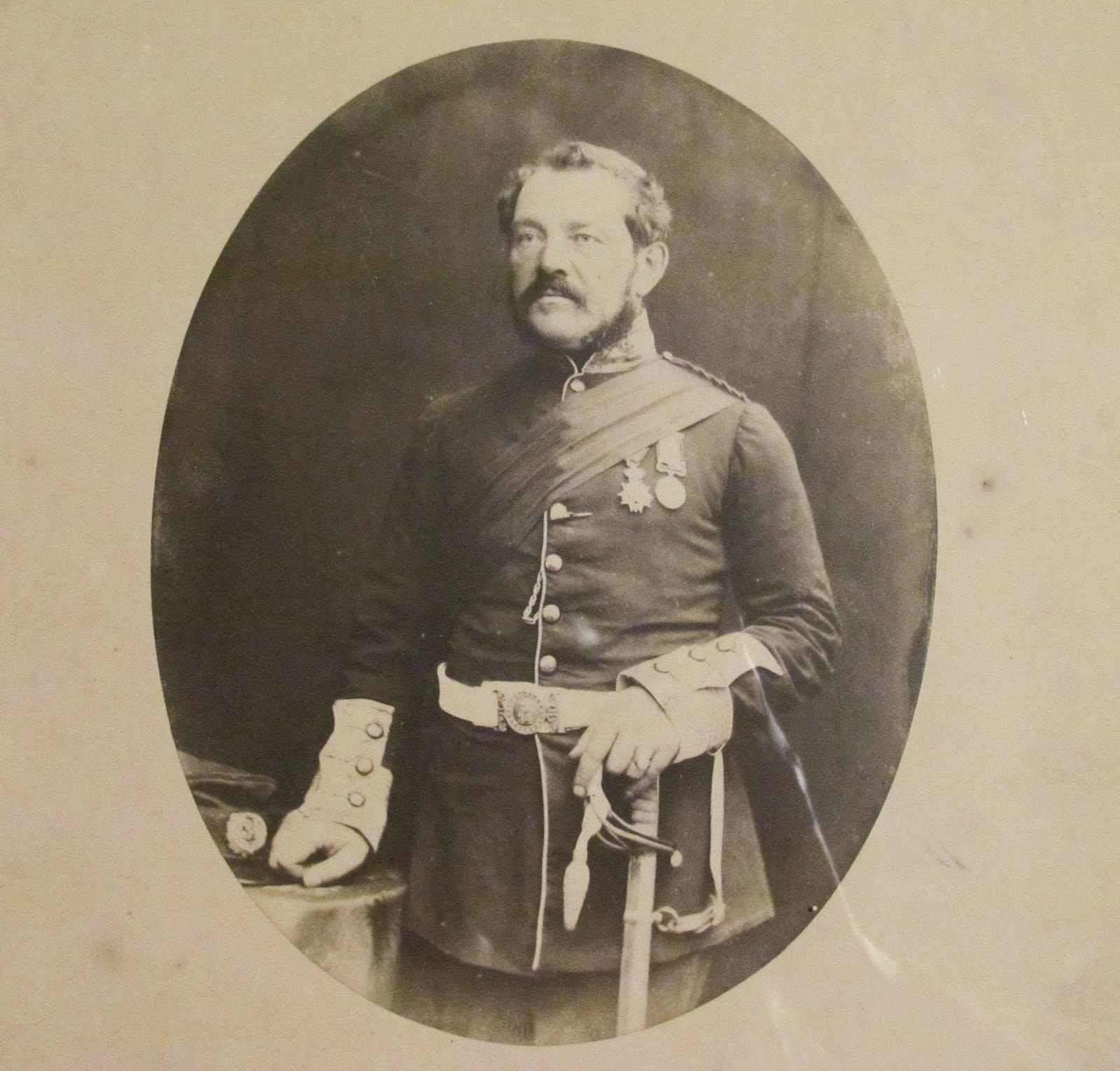
General Sir Richard Denis Kelly, colonel of the regiment in the early 1880s

The regiment was originally raised by the Honourable East India Company in 1853 as the 3rd Bombay (European) Regiment and then saw action in India in 1857 during the Indian Rebellion. After the Crown took control of the Presidency armies in the aftermath of the Indian Rebellion, the regiment became the 3rd Bombay Regiment in November 1859. It was then renumbered as the 109th Regiment of Foot (Bombay Infantry) on transfer to the British Army in September 1862. It embarked for England in 1877.

As part of the Cardwell Reforms of the 1870s, where single-battalion regiments were linked together to share a single depot and recruiting district in the United Kingdom, the 109th was linked with the 100th (Prince of Wales's Royal Canadian) Regiment of Foot, and assigned to district no. 67 at Birr Barracks in Birr, County Offaly. On 1 July 1881 the Childers Reforms came into effect and the regiment amalgamated with the 100th (Prince of Wales's Royal Canadian) Regiment of Foot to form the Prince of Wales's Leinster Regiment (Royal Canadians).

== Battle honours ==
The regiment's battle honours were:

- Indian Mutiny: Central India

== Regimental Colonels ==
The Regimental Colonels were:

- 1862–1873: Gen. Sir William Wyllie, GCB
- 1873–1880: Gen. Mark Kerr Atherley
- 1880–1881: Gen. Sir Richard Denis Kelly, KCB
