= Birr Barracks =

Military barracks in County Offaly, Ireland

- Dún Bhiorra
- Crinkill, Birr, County Offaly
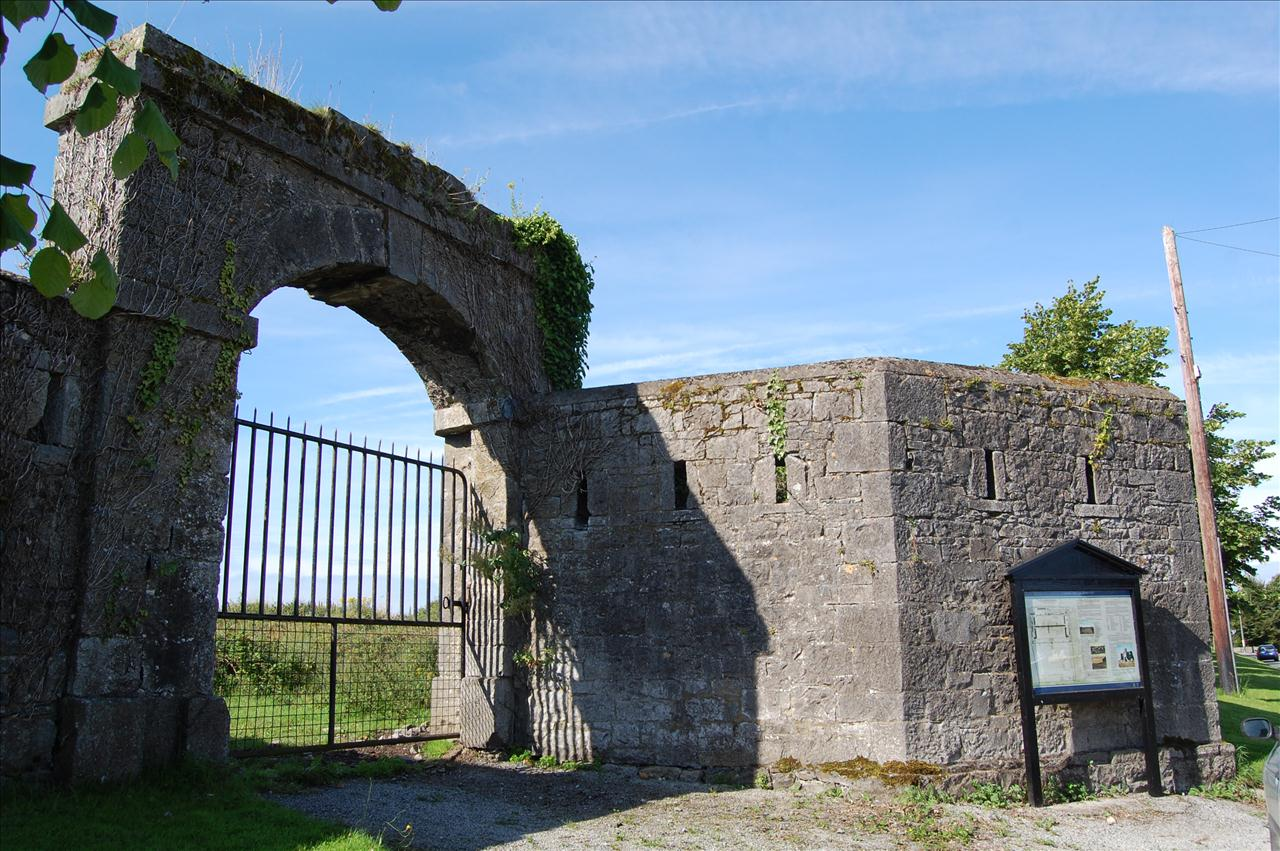
- Entrance to Birr Barracks

Site information
- Type: Barracks
- Operator: (Republic of Ireland) Irish Army

Location
- Location within Ireland
- Coordinates: 53.07812°N 7.895216°W

Site history
- Built: 1809-1812
- Built for: War Office
- In use: 1812-1922

Garrison information
- Garrison: Prince of Wales's Leinster Regiment (Royal Canadians)

Birr Barracks (Irish: Dún Bhiorra) also known as Crinkill Barracks (Irish: Dún Chríonchoill) was a military installation in Crinkill, near Birr, County Offaly in Ireland.

== History ==
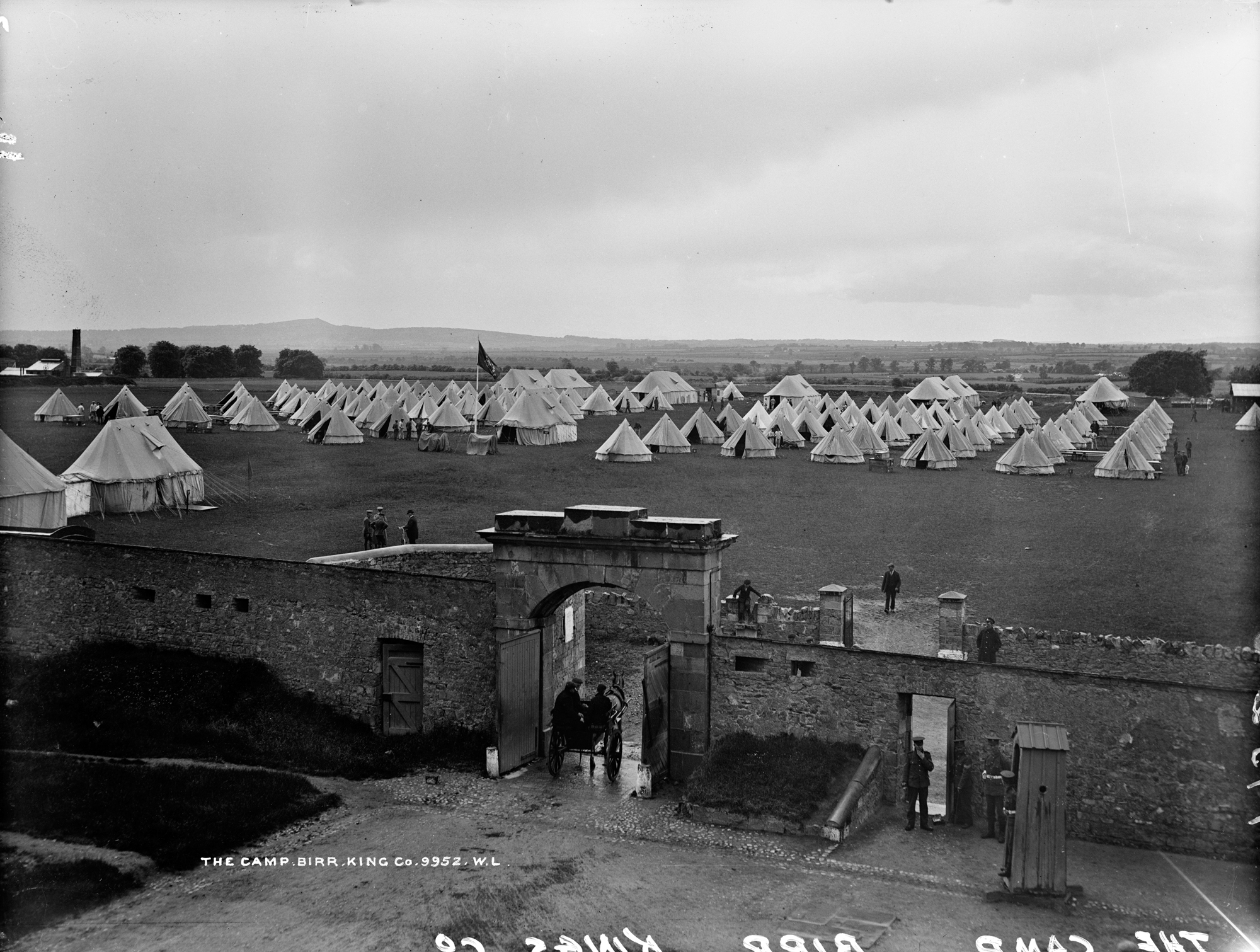
The Barracks around 1900

The barracks were built by Bernard Mullins at the instigation of Lawrence Parsons, 2nd Earl of Rosse, who had supported the need to build some barracks within a few hours’ march of the River Shannon, and were completed between 1809 and 1812. In 1873 a system of recruiting areas based on counties was instituted under the Cardwell Reforms, and the barracks became the depot for the 100th (Prince of Wales's Royal Canadian) Regiment of Foot and the 109th Regiment of Foot (Bombay Infantry). Following the Childers Reforms, the 100th and 109th regiments amalgamated to form the Prince of Wales's Leinster Regiment (Royal Canadians) with its depot in the barracks in 1881. The regiment moved into the barracks on 17 November 1882.

Some 6,000 recruits enlisted at the barracks during the First World War: an air strip was built there in 1917, and Sergeant John Allan was killed when his plane crashed into Crinkill House on 28 March 1919.

The Prince of Wales's Leinster Regiment (Royal Canadians) was disbanded at the time of Irish independence in 1922. The barracks were taken over by the Irish Army at that time, but a small group of Irish Republican Army irregulars took control of the barracks and burnt them to the ground on 14 July 1922. The remaining ruins were demolished in 1985.

In 2013 the Regimental Association of the Prince of Wales's Leinster Regiment (Royal Canadians) erected a memorial to commemorate the regiment's strong linkages with the area.

== See also ==
- List of Irish military installations
