= 100th (Prince of Wales's Royal Canadian) Regiment of Foot =

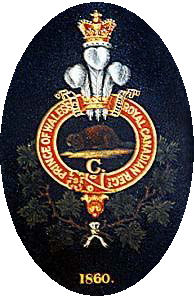
- Badge of the 100th (Prince of Wales's Royal Canadian) Regiment of Foot
- Active: 1858–1881
- Country: United Kingdom
- Branch: British Army
- Type: Line Infantry
- Role: Light Infantry
- Size: One battalion
- Garrison/HQ: Birr Barracks, Birr, County Offaly
- Motto: Ich Dien
- Colors: Blue Facings,
- March: Quick: Slow:

The 100th (Prince of Wales's Royal Canadian) Regiment of Foot was a British Army regiment, raised in 1858. Under the Childers Reforms it amalgamated with the 109th Regiment of Foot (Bombay Infantry) to form the Prince of Wales's Leinster Regiment (Royal Canadians) in 1881.

== History ==
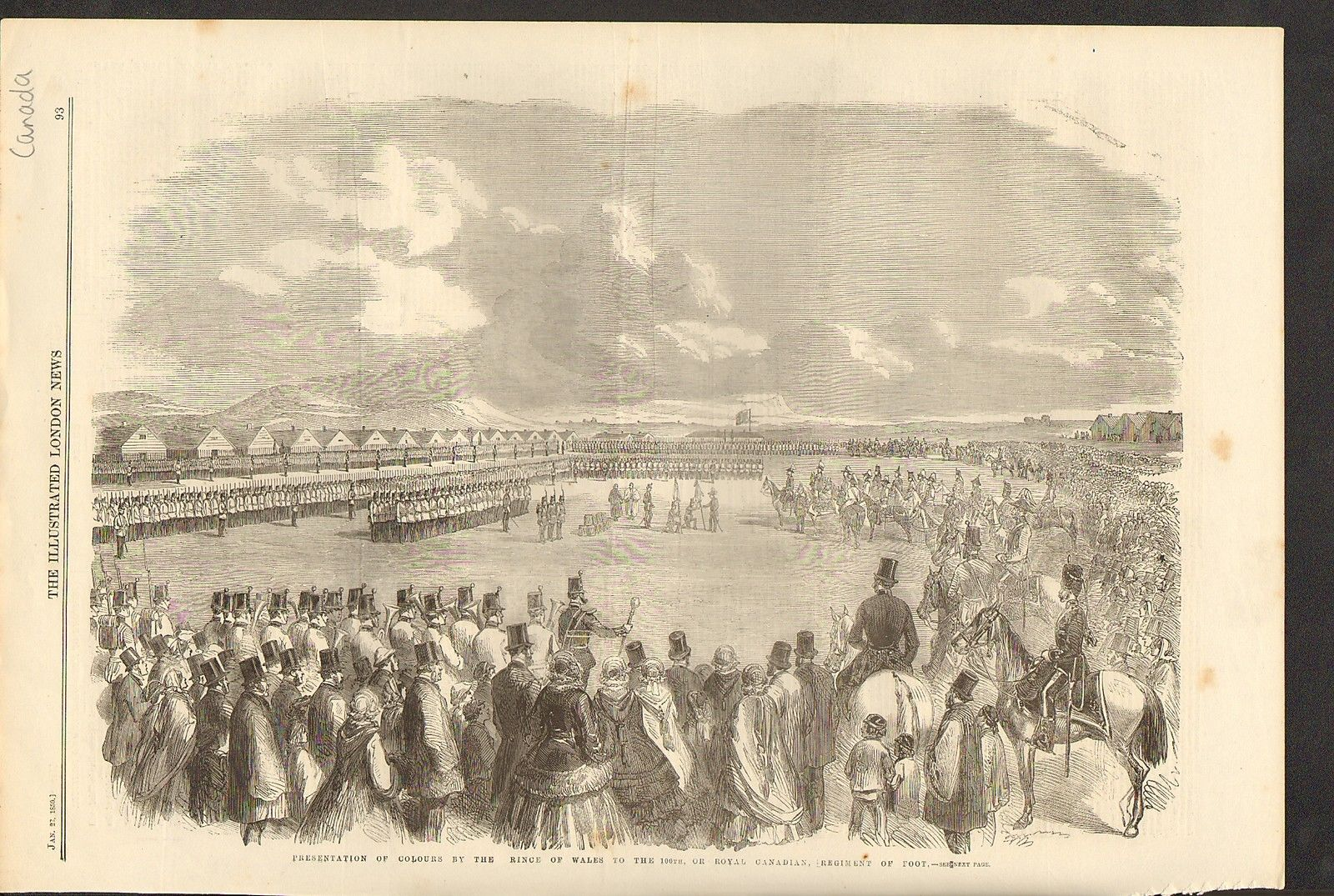
The 100th Regiment receiving their regimental colours by The Prince of Wales, January 1859.

The regiment, which was named after Prince Albert Edward, future King Edward VII, was raised in the Province of Canada to create extra military resources following the Indian Rebellion in June 1858. It embarked for England later that year and was posted to Gibraltar in 1863 but moved to Malta later that year. It returned to Canada in 1866 and took part in the ceremony for the inauguration of the Dominion of Canada on 1 July 1867, before returning to England in 1868.

In 1875 it was declared the successor to the 100th Regiment of Foot (Prince Regent's County of Dublin Regiment), which had served in Canada, and allowed to use the battle honour "Niagara". It embarked for Bengal in India in 1877.

As part of the Cardwell Reforms of the 1870s, where single-battalion regiments were linked together to share a single depot and recruiting district in the United Kingdom, the 100th was linked with the 109th Regiment of Foot (Bombay Infantry), and assigned to district no. 67 at Birr Barracks in Birr, County Offaly. On 1 July 1881 the Childers Reforms came into effect and the regiment amalgamated with the 109th Regiment of Foot (Bombay Infantry) to form the Prince of Wales's Leinster Regiment (Royal Canadians).

== Battle honours ==
Battle honours won by the regiment were:

- Niagara (awarded in 1815 to 100th Regiment of Foot (Prince Regent's County of Dublin Regiment) and regranted to 100th (Prince of Wales's Royal Canadian) Regiment of Foot in 1875).

== Colonels of the Regiment ==
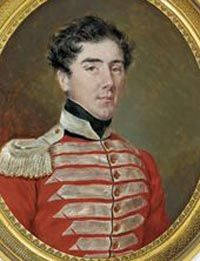
General Henry Dundas, 3rd Viscount Melville was the first colonel of the regiment.

Colonels of the Regiment were:

100th (or Prince of Wales's Royal Canadian) Regiment of Foot

- 1858–1862: Gen. Henry Dundas, 3rd Viscount Melville, GCB
- 1862–1872: Lt-Gen. Sir Edward Macarthur, KCB
- 1872: Maj-Gen. Charles Rochfort Scott
- 1872–1881: Gen. Hon. Sir Alexander Hamilton-Gordon, KCB
