= Dillon baronets =

Extinct baronetcy in the Baronetage of the United Kingdom

Escutcheon of the Dillon baronets of Lismullen

The Dillon Baronetcy of Lismullen, in County Meath was created in Baronetage of the United Kingdom in 1801. It became extinct with the death of the 8th Baronet in 1982.

The baronets also held the title of Baron Dillon of the Holy Roman Empire, which was granted by Imperial Letters Patent of the Emperor Joseph II dated 4 July 1783. The ancestral motto is Whilst I breathe I hope. Royal Licence to use this title was granted by King George III on 22 February 1784.

== Dillon baronets, of Lismullen (1801) ==
- Sir John Talbot Dillon, 1st Baronet (1739–1805)
- Sir Charles Drake Dillon, 2nd Baronet (died 1840)
- Sir Arthur Richard Dillon, 3rd Baronet (died 1845)
- Sir William Dillon, 4th Baronet (1774–1851)
- Sir Arthur Henry Dillon, 5th Baronet (1828–1852)
- Sir John Dillon, 6th Baronet (1806–1875)
- Sir John Fox Dillon, 7th Baronet (1843–1925)
- Sir Robert Dillon, 8th Baronet (1914–1982); brother of Michael Dillon (1915–1962)

Michael Dillon, the brother of Sir Robert Dillon, was assigned as female at birth in 1915. However, during 1944–1949, Michael Dillon became one of the first transgender men to undergo a successful legal and medical gender reassignment from female to male, including genital surgery and hormone therapy. In 1958, Debrett's Peerage thus listed Michael as heir to his brother's baronetcy, while Burke's Peerage continued to list Michael as a sister, using the name and gender from the original pre-1944 birth certificate. The editor of Debrett's told Time magazine that Michael Dillon was unquestionably next in line for the baronetcy, saying: "I have always been of the opinion that a person has all rights and privileges of the sex that is, at a given moment, recognized." Since Michael died before Robert, his candidacy to inherit the baronetcy ultimately became moot.

== Notes ==
Baronetage of the United Kingdom
Preceded by Douglas baronets	Dillon baronets of Lismullen; 31 July 1801	Succeeded by Homan baronets
