= Prince of Wales's Leinster Regiment (Royal Canadians) =

Infantry regiment

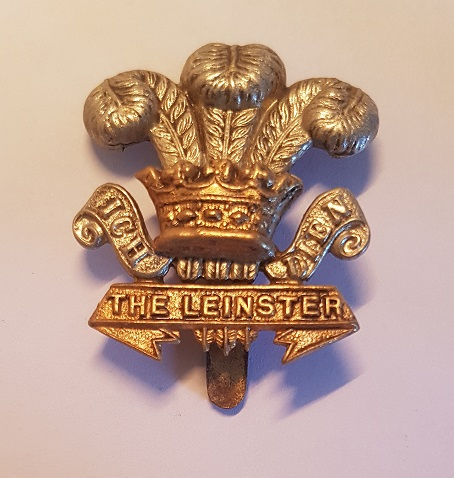
- Badge of the Prince of Wales's Leinster Regiment
- Active: 1881–1922
- Allegiance: United Kingdom
- Branch: British Army
- Type: Infantry Regiment
- Role: Line Infantry
- Size: 2 Regular Battalions 3 Militia and Special Reserve Battalions 2 Hostilities-only Battalions
- Garrison/HQ: Birr Barracks, Birr
- Nickname: Royal Canadians
- Patron: Prince of Wales
- Motto: Ich Dien (I Serve)
- March: Quick: The Royal Canadian; Come Back to Erin

The Prince of Wales's Leinster Regiment (Royal Canadians) was an infantry regiment of the line in the British Army, formed in 1881 by the amalgamation of the 100th (Prince of Wales's Royal Canadian) Regiment of Foot and the 109th Regiment of Foot (Bombay Infantry). The 100th Foot was first raised in 1858 and the 109th was first raised in 1853. Between the time of its formation and Irish independence, it was one of eight Irish regiments raised largely in Ireland, with its Birr Barracks home depot in Birr. It was disbanded with the Partition of Ireland following establishment of the independent Irish Free State in 1922 when the five regiments that had their traditional recruiting grounds in the counties of the new state were disbanded.

== History ==
=== 19th century ===
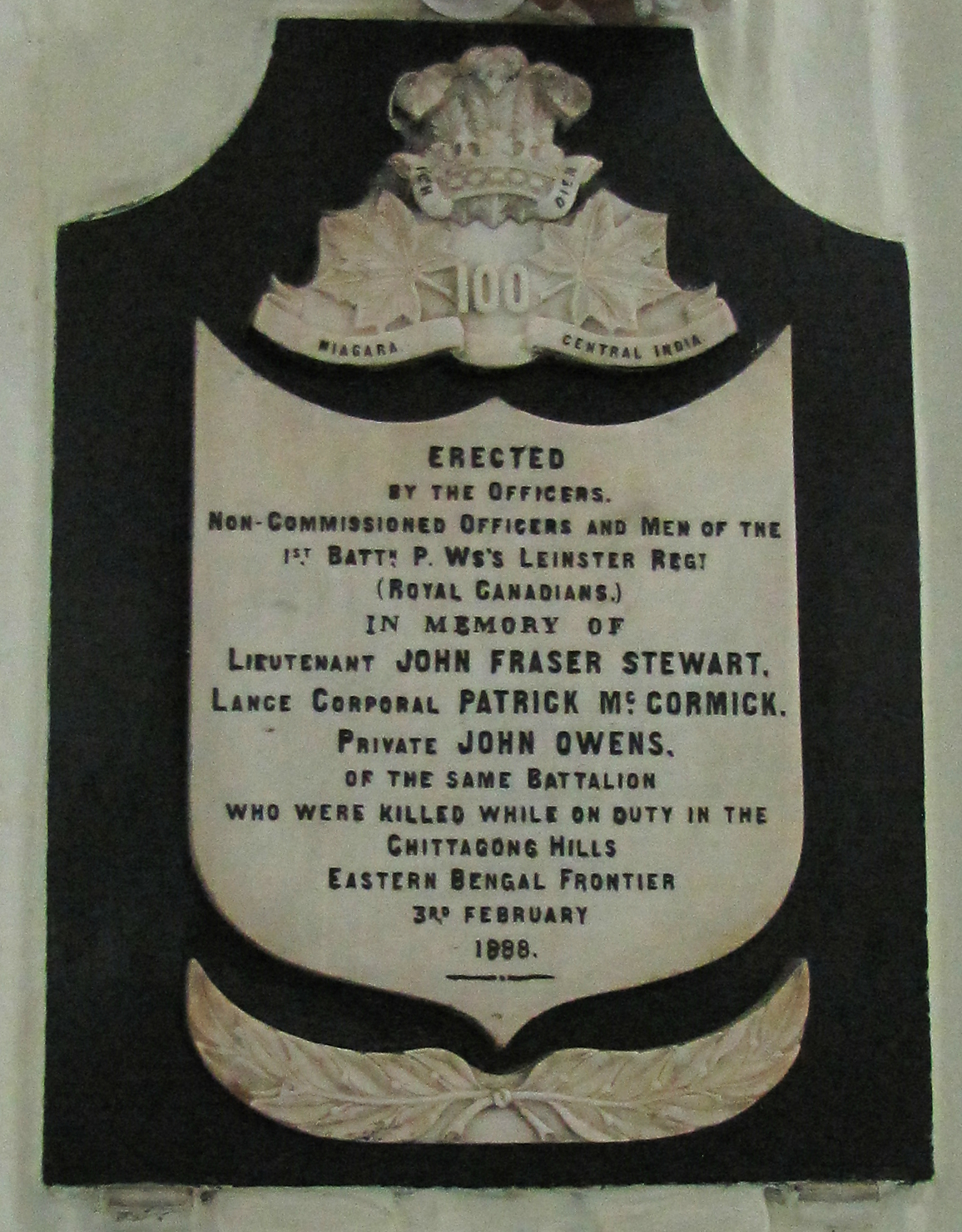
A memorial plaque of the Leinster Regt in St Peter's Church, Fort William, Kolkata.

The regiment was formed in 1881 by the amalgamation of the 100th (Prince of Wales's Royal Canadian) Regiment of Foot and the 109th Regiment of Foot (Bombay Infantry). The amalgamation of the two regiments into one with the title Prince of Wales's Leinster Regiment (Royal Canadians), was part of the United Kingdom government's reorganization of the British Army under the Childers Reforms, a continuation of the Cardwell Reforms implemented in 1879.

It was one of eight Irish regiments raised largely in Ireland, with its home depot at Birr Barracks in Birr. The regiment recruited mainly in the province of Leinster. Militarily, the whole of Ireland was administered as a separate command within the United Kingdom with Command Headquarters at Parkgate (Phoenix Park) in Dublin, directly under the War Office in London.

The 1st Battalion, which had been in India, moved to Ireland in 1894. A detachment took part in the Fourth Anglo-Ashanti War in 1895, but the rest of the battalion remained in Ireland until moving to Halifax, Canada, in 1898. The 2nd Battalion moved to Ireland in 1882 and to England in 1888. It transferred to Malta in 1894, and joined the Bermuda Garrison the following year. In 1897, it moved to Halifax, and in 1898 to the West Indies.

=== Second Boer War ===
Both regular battalions were deployed to South Africa for the Second Boer War. The 1st Battalion saw action around Bethlehem in April 1902 when 14 men were wounded while the 2nd Battalion held the Heilbron branch line in February 1902 when they had 10 casualties. The 1st battalion stayed until the end of the war, following which 370 officers and men left Cape Town on the SS Englishman in late September 1902, and arrived at Southampton in late October, when they were posted to Fermoy. The 3rd (King's County Militia) Battalion, formed from the former King's County Royal Rifle Militia, was embodied in early 1900 for service in South Africa. 520 officers and men embarked from Southampton on the SS Kildonan Castle in early March 1900, returning to Ireland after more than two years in late May 1902.

In 1908, the Volunteers and Militia were reorganised nationally, with the former becoming the Territorial Force and the latter the Special Reserve; the regiment now had three Special Reserve but no Territorial battalions.

=== First World War ===
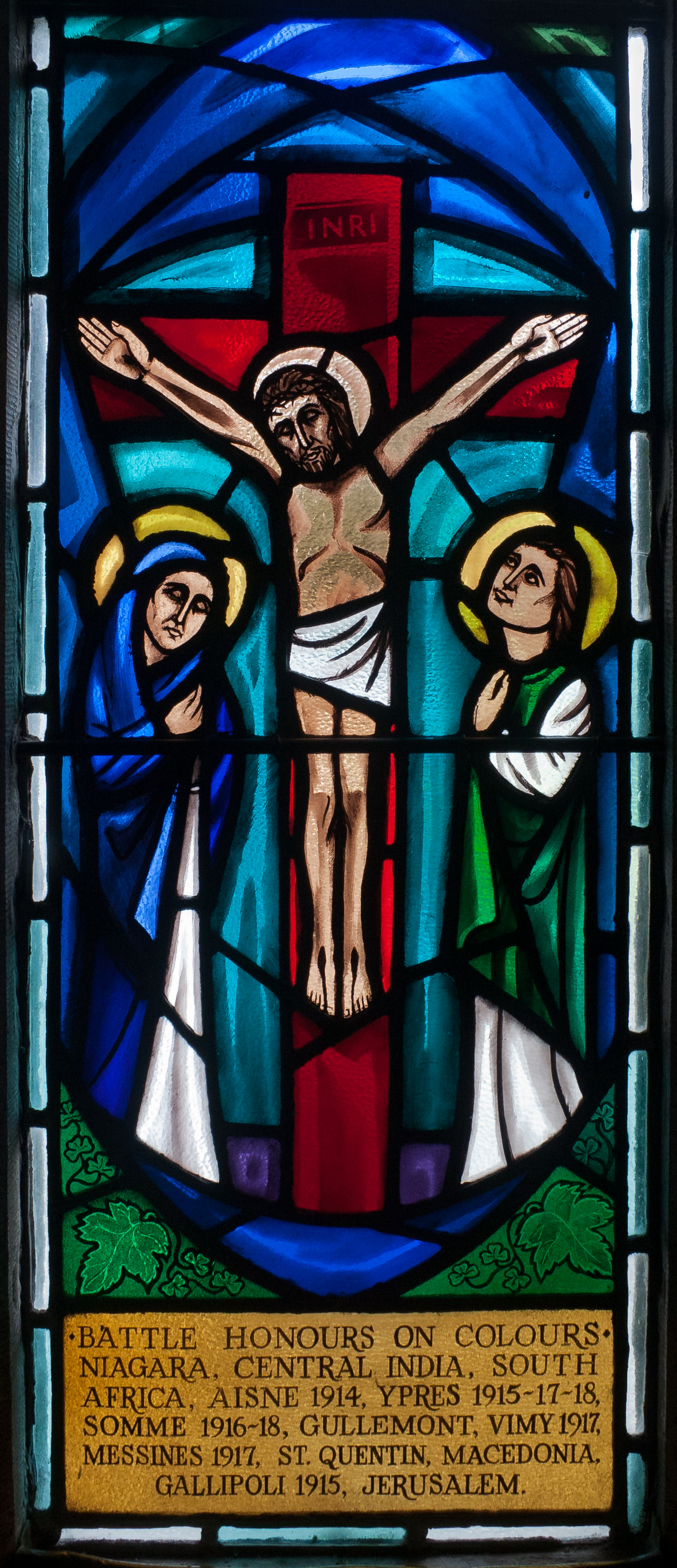
Detail of a memorial window dedicated to the Prince of Wales's Leinster Regiment at St. Brendan's Church in Birr, enumerating the locations of service

==== Regular Army ====
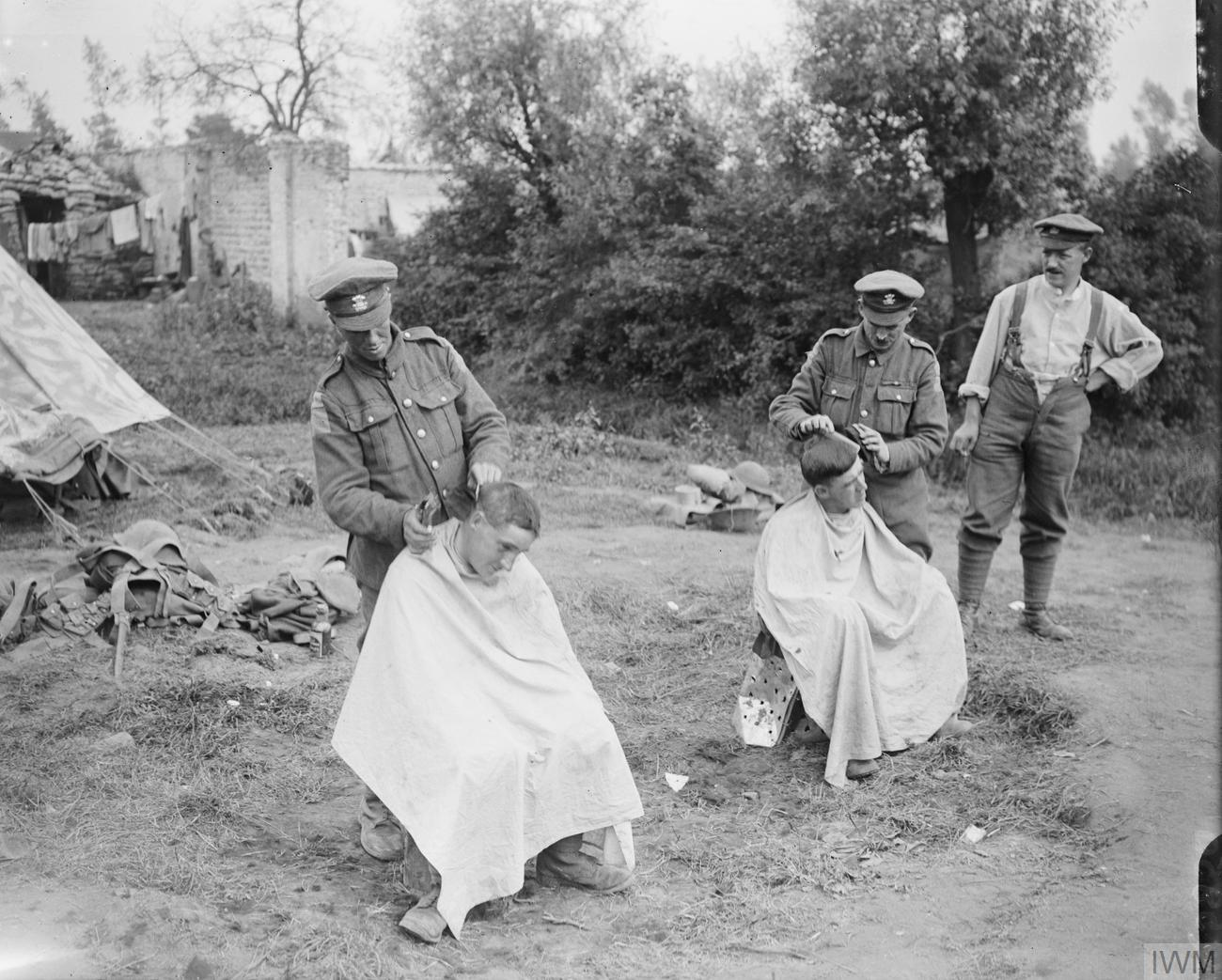
Barbers of the 2nd Battalion, Leinster Regiment, at work in their camp at Dickebusch after the battle of 31 July. Photograph taken on 9 August 1917.

The 1st Battalion, which had been at Faizabad in India, landed at Le Havre as part of the 82nd Infantry Brigade in the 27th Division in December 1914 for service on the Western Front but moved to Salonika in December 1915 and then moved to Egypt for service in Palestine in September 1917.

The 2nd Battalion landed at Saint-Nazaire as part of the 17th Infantry Brigade in the 6th Division in September 1914 for service on the Western Front.

==== New Armies ====
The 6th (Service) Battalion landed at Anzac Cove as part of the 29th Infantry Brigade in the 10th (Irish) Division in August 1915 but moved to Salonika in September 1915 and on to Egypt for service in Palestine in September 1917 before landing at Marseille in June 1918 for service on the Western Front.

The 7th Battalion landed at Le Havre as part of the 47th Infantry Brigade in the 16th (Irish) Division in December 1915 for service on the Western Front.

=== Post-war ===
After the war the 1st Leinsters returned to Madras. In August 1921, the governor of Madras requested military support to suppress resistance by Mappila rebels. By February 1922 the Malabar Force (which included the Leinsters) under command of Edward Thomas Humphreys had put down the rebellion.

=== Disbandment ===
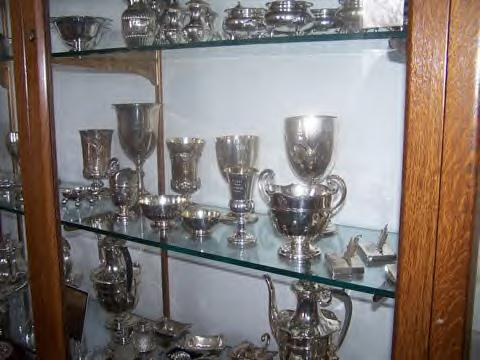
Leinster Plate, a collection of silverware, of the Prince of Wales's Leinster Regiment at the Royal Military College of Canada

Due to substantial defence cuts and the establishment of the Irish Free State in 1922, it was agreed that the six former Southern Ireland regiments would be disbanded, including the Prince of Wales's Leinster Regiment (Royal Canadians). On 12 June, five regimental colours were laid up in a ceremony at St George's Hall, Windsor Castle in the presence of HM King George V. The six regiments were then all disbanded on 31 July 1922. With the simultaneous outbreak of the Irish Civil War conflict some thousands of their ex-servicemen and officers contributed to expanding the Free State government's newly formed National Army. They brought considerable combat experience with them and by May 1923 comprised 50 per cent of its 53,000 soldiers and 20 per cent of its officers. Serving personnel of the Prince of Wales's Leinster Regiment were given the option of transferring to other units if they wished to continue to serve in the British Army.

In recognition of their Canadian roots, the officers of the 1st Battalion decided to give their officers' mess silver 'in trust' to the Government of Canada "as a token of the regard for the Great Dominion which gave birth to the Battalion to be held in trust until such time as the Battalion is again raised". The silver, known as "The Leinster Plate", was deposited for safe keeping at the Royal Military College of Canada in 1923 at the suggestion of Edward Mortimer Macdonald and James MacBrien, Canada's Minister of National Defence and Chief of Staff respectively. The silver is on display at Royal Military College of Canada in the Senior Staff Mess and Museum (Fort Frederic).

In 2013 the Regimental Association erected a memorial to commemorate the regiment's strong linkages with the Birr area, particularly to Birr Barracks.

== Battle honours ==
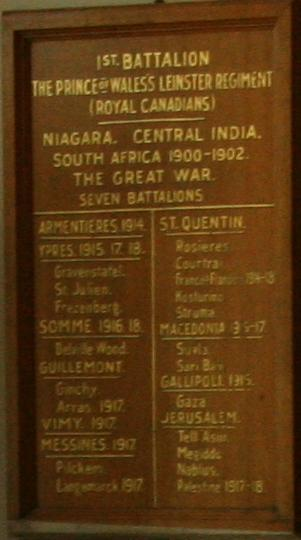
Prince of Wales's Leinster Regiment plaque at the Royal Military College of Canada Senior Staff Mess, enumerating the locations of service.

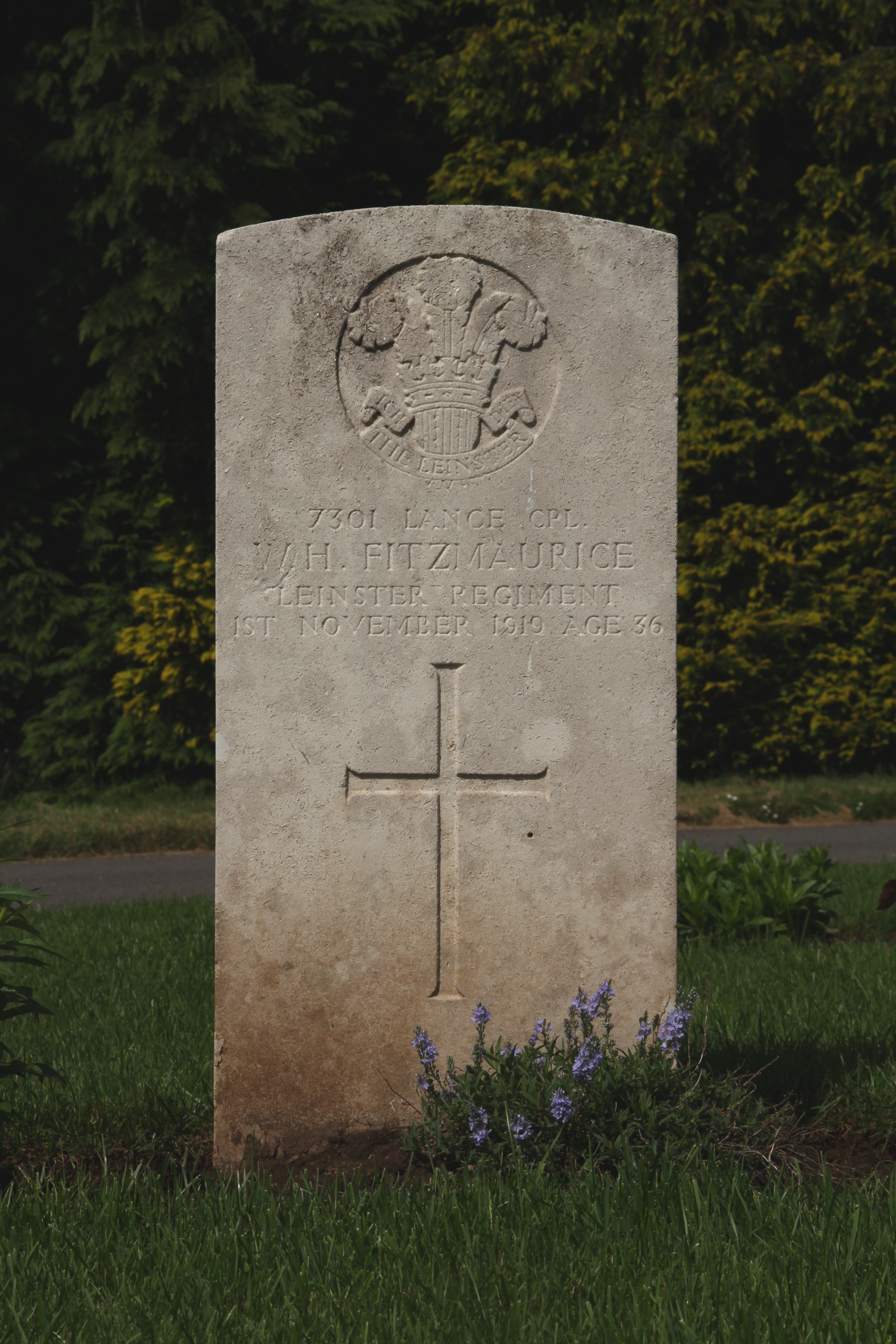
Grave in Cathays Cemetery, Cardiff, Wales, of Sergeant WH Fitzmaurice, Leinster Regiment, who died in 1919

The regiment's battle honours were as follows:

- From 100th Regiment of Foot: Niagara
- From 109th Regiment of Foot: Central India
- Second Boer War: South Africa 1900–02
- The Great War:

Campaign	Battle	Date
None	Armentières 1914	1914
Second Battle of Ypres	Battle of Gravenstafel	22–23 April 1915
	Battle of St. Julien	24 April – 4 May 1915
	Battle of Frezenberg	8–13 May 1915
Battle of the Somme	Bourlon Wood	
	Battle of Guillemont	3–6 September 1916
	Battle of Ginchy	9 September 1916
Battle of Arras	Battle of Vimy Ridge	9 – 14 April 1917
Third Battle of Ypres	Battle of Messines	7 – 14 June 1917
	Battle of Pilckem Ridge	31 July – 3 August 1917
	Battle of Langemarck (1917)	16–18 August 1917
	First Battle of Passchendaele	12 October 1917
	Second Battle of Passchendaele	26 October – 10 November 1917
The German Offensives 1918	First Battles of the Somme, 1918	
	St. Quentin	21–23 March 1918
	Actions at the Somme Crossings	24–25 March 1918
	Battle of Rosieres	26–27 March 1918
	Courtrai 1918	28 June 1918
The Advance To Victory 1918	Battle of Amiens	8 – 11 August 1918
Second Battles of the Somme, 1918	Delville Wood	
	Cambrai, 1918 (Capture of Cambrai)	8–9 October 1918
	Battle of Ypres, 1918	28 September – 2 October 1918
	Battle of Courtrai	14–19 October 1918
Macedonia 1915–17	Battle of Kastrino	
	Battle of Struma	
Gallipoli 1915	Suvla	
	Sari Bair	
Palestine 1917–18	First Battle of Gaza	26 March 1917
	Battle of Jerusalem (1917)	26–30 December 1917
	Battle of Megiddo (1918)	19 and 25 September 1918
	Nablus	19 and 25 September 1918
	Battle of Tell 'Asur	8 and 12 March 1918

== Victoria Cross recipients ==
- Lieutenant John Vincent Holland, Great War
- Corporal John Cunningham, Great War
- Private Martin Joseph Moffat, Great War
- Sergeant John O'Neill, Great War

== Colonel-in-chief ==
- 1919–: F.M. HM King Edward VIII

== Regimental colonels ==
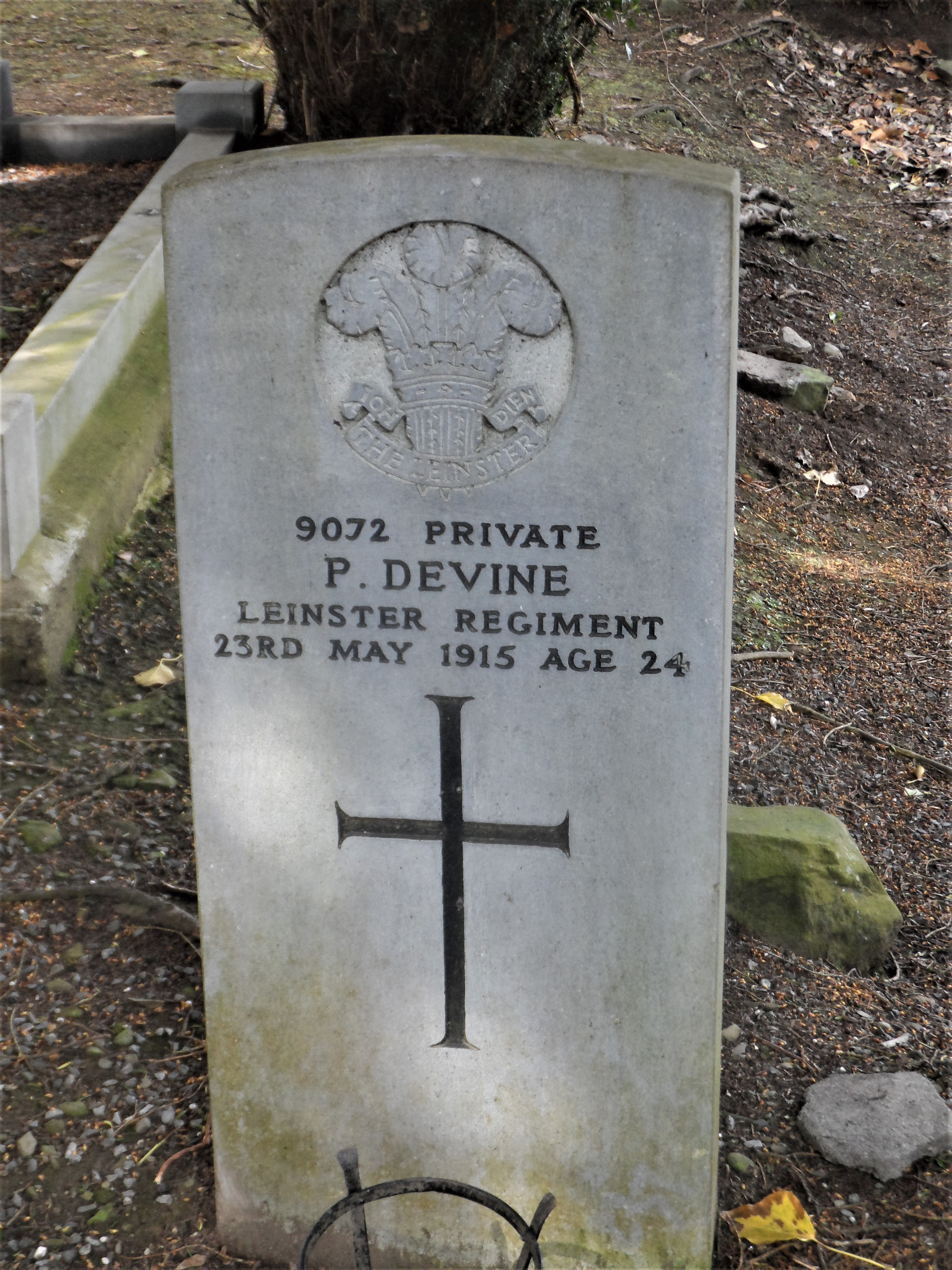
Grave of Private P. Devine, Kells, County Meath, of the Leinster Regiment.

Colonels of the regiment were:

- 1881–1890 (1st Battalion): Gen. Sir Alexander Gordon, KCB (ex 100th Foot)
- 1881–1889 (2nd Battalion): Gen. Sir Richard Denis Kelly, KCB (ex 109th Foot)
- 1890–1891: Gen. Henry Meade Hamilton, CB
- 1891–1894: Gen. Sir Patrick Leonard MacDougall, KCMG
- 1894–1910: Lt-Gen. Alastair McIan Macdonald
- 1910–1919: Maj-Gen. George Upton Prior
- 1919–1922: Maj-Gen. Sir Gerald Farrell Boyd, KCB, CMG, DSO, DCM
- 1922: Regiment disbanded
