= Charles Fox (Irish politician) =

Irish politician, died 1862

Charles Fox (c. 1791 – 24 February 1862) was an Irish politician.

Fox stood for the Conservative Party in the 1836 County Longford by-election, but he was defeated by Luke White. However, White was removed on petition, and Fox was declared elected. He took his seat on 5 May 1837, and served until the parliament was dissolved, on 18 August. At the 1837 UK general election, Fox again contested County Longford, but was again unsuccessful, and he did not return to Parliament.

He died at Mount Anville on 24 February 1862, aged 71.

Parliament of the United Kingdom
Preceded by Luke White; Anthony Lefroy	Member of Parliament for County Longford; 1836 – 1837; With: Anthony Lefroy	Succeeded by Luke White; Henry White
