= Sir George Fetherston, 3rd Baronet =

Sir George Ralph Fetherston, 3rd Baronet (4 June 1784 – 12 July 1853) was an Anglo-Irish politician.

Fetherston was the son of Sir Thomas Fetherston, 2nd Baronet, by Catherine, daughter of George Boleyn Whitney. He was educated at Newcombe's School, Hackney, London, and at Trinity College, Cambridge. He joined Lincoln's Inn in 1804.

In 1810 he was appointed Major of the Royal Longford Militia and commanded the regiment during its deployment to England in 1813–14. He continued in the disembodied regiment after Waterloo and was promoted to Lieutenant-Colonel in 1833.

He sat in the House of Commons of the United Kingdom as one of the Members of Parliament for County Longford between 1819 and 1830. On 19 July 1819 he succeeded to his father's baronetcy.

Parliament of the United Kingdom
Preceded by Viscount Forbes; Sir Thomas Fetherston, Bt	Member of Parliament for County Longford; 1819–1830; With: Viscount Forbes	Succeeded by Viscount Forbes; Anthony Lefroy
Baronetage of Ireland
Preceded by Thomas Fetherston	Baronet (of Ardagh); 1819–1853	Succeeded by Thomas Fetherston
