= James Halpin Rorke =

Irish politician, died 1849

James Halpin Rorke (about 1795 – 1849) was an Irish politician.

Rorke stood for the Irish Repeal Association in County Longford at the 1832 UK general election. He topped the poll and was declared elected. However, in April 1833, the election was declared void, and Rorke opted not to stand in the resulting by-election.

Parliament of the United Kingdom
Preceded by Anthony Lefroy; George Forbes	Member of Parliament for County Longford; 1832 – 1833; With: George Forbes	Succeeded by Anthony Lefroy; George Forbes
