= Sir George Errington, 1st Baronet =

Irish politician

George Errington MP
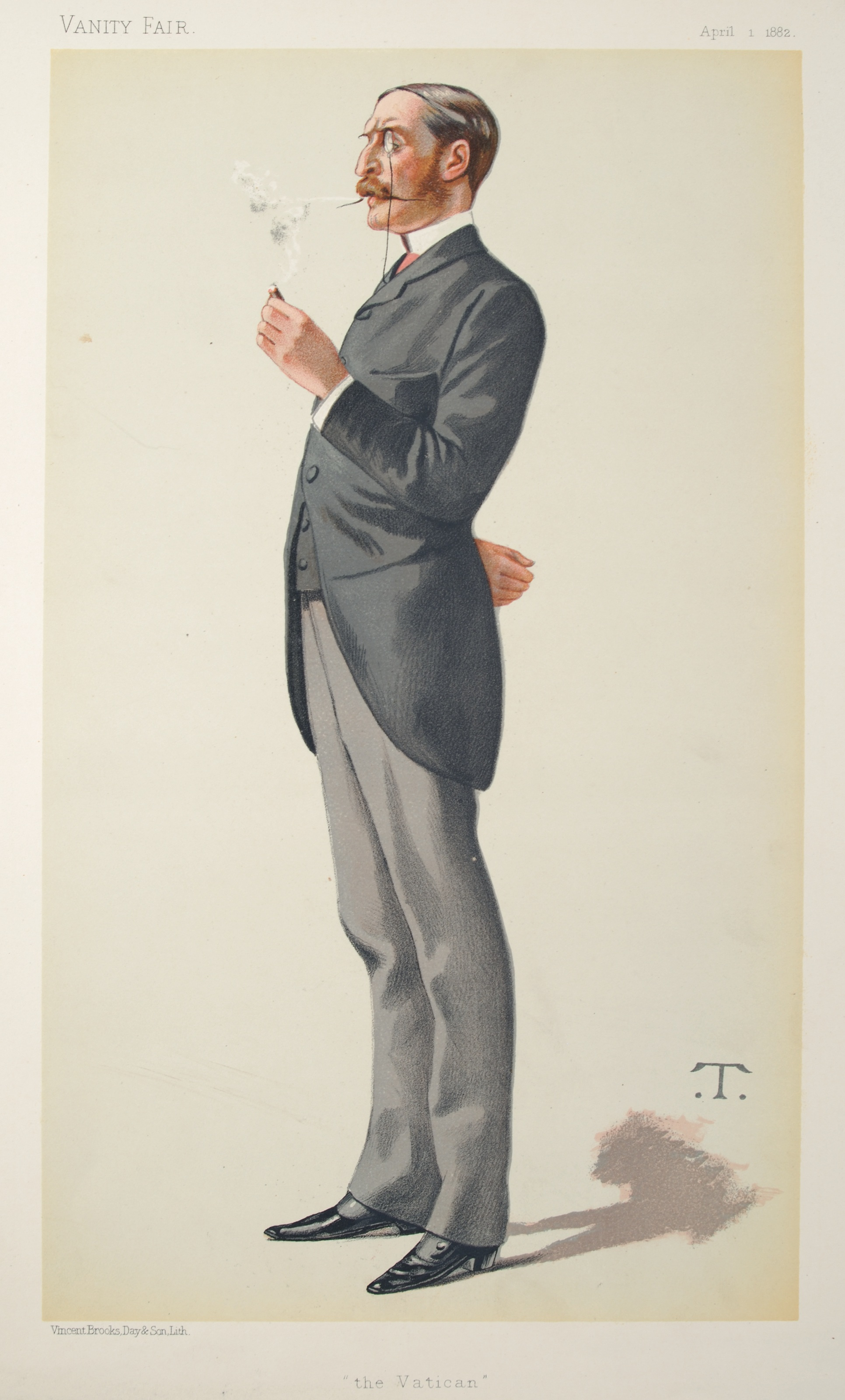

Member of Parliament for County Longford
- In office 31 January 1874 – 24 November 1885 Serving with: Justin McCarthy (1879 – 1885); Myles O'Reilly (1874 – 1879)
- Preceded by: Myles O'Reilly; George Greville-Nugent
- Succeeded by: Constituency abolished

Personal details
- Born: 1839
- Died: 19 March 1920 (aged 80)
- Party: Home Rule League

Sir George Errington, 1st Baronet (1839 – 19 March 1920) was an Irish Home Rule League politician.

He was elected a Member of Parliament (MP) for County Longford in 1874 and held the seat until it was abolished in 1885.

Errington was created the 1st Baronet of Lackham Manor on 18 July 1885; upon his death leaving no heir the title became extinct.

== Arms ==
Coat of arms of Sir George Errington, 1st Baronet
| Notes Granted 10 September 1885 by Sir John Bernard Burke, Ulster King of Arms. The arms as blazoned and emblazoned in the official catalogue do not include the canton with the Red Hand of Ulster as depicted here. Crest A unicorn's head erased quarterly Argent and Gules armed and crined Or. Escutcheon Argent two bars Azure in chief three escallops of the last and in base a trefoil slipped Vert. Motto Vigilans Et Audax |

Parliament of the United Kingdom
| Preceded by Myles O'Reilly; George Greville-Nugent | Member of Parliament for County Longford; 1874 – 1885; With: Justin McCarthy (1879 – 1885); Myles O'Reilly (1874 – 1879) | Constituency abolished |
Baronetage of the United Kingdom
| New creation | Baronet (of Lackham Manor); 1885-1920 | Extinct |
| Preceded by Millais baronets | Errington baronets of Lackham Manor; 18 July 1885 | Succeeded by Jardine baronets |
