= Sir Thomas Fetherston, 2nd Baronet =

Anglo-Irish politician

Sir Thomas Fetherston, 2nd Baronet (1759 – 19 July 1819), alias Fetherstonhaugh, was an Anglo-Irish politician.

Fetherston was the son of Sir Ralph Fetherston, 1st Baronet and succeeded to his title in 1780. He sat in the Irish House of Commons as the Member of Parliament for St Johnstown between 1783 and 1790, and then represented County Longford from 1796 to 1800. He subsequently sat for County Longford in the House of Commons of the United Kingdom between 1801 and his death in 1819. He was succeeded in his title by his son, George Ralph Fetherston.

Parliament of Ireland
Preceded by Sackville Hamilton; Hon. John Vaughan	Member of Parliament for St Johnstown; 1783–1790; With: Nicholas Colthurst	Succeeded by George Cavendish; John Taylor
Preceded by William Gleadowe-Newcomen, Bt; Caleb Barnes Harman	Member of Parliament for County Longford; 1768–1780; With: William Gleadowe-Newcomen, Bt	Parliament of Ireland abolished
Parliament of the United Kingdom
New parliament	Member of Parliament for County Longford; 1801–1819; With: Sir William Gleadowe-Newcomen, Bt (1801–1802); Hon. Thomas Gleadowe-Newcomen (1802–1806); Viscount Forbes (1806–1819)	Succeeded by Viscount Forbes; George Ralph Fetherston
Baronetage of Ireland
Preceded by Ralph Fetherston	Baronet (of Ardagh); 1780–1819	Succeeded by George Ralph Fetherston
