= Royal Longford Rifle Militia =

Auxiliary unit of the British Army

Prince of Wales's Royal Longford Militia Royal Longford Rifles 6th (Royal Longford Militia) Battalion, Rifle Brigade
- Active: 11 April 1793–31 July 1908
- Country: Ireland (1793–1800); United Kingdom (1801–1908)
- Branch: Militia
- Role: Infantry
- Size: 1 Battalion
- Part of: Rifle Brigade (The Prince Consort's Own)
- Garrison/HQ: Longford Barracks
- Engagements: Irish Rebellion of 1798: Kilcavan Hill; Battle of Vinegar Hill; Battle of Castlebar; Battle of Ballinamuck

Commanders
- Notable commanders: George Forbes, 6th Earl of Granard

The Royal Longford Rifles was an Irish Militia regiment raised in County Longford in 1793. It saw action during the Irish Rebellion of 1798, when it was involved in the rout known as the 'Castlebar Races'. It later became a battalion of the Rifle Brigade (The Prince Consort's Own), but was disbanded in 1908.

== Background ==
Although there are scattered references to town guards in 1584, no organised militia existed in Ireland before 1660. After that date, some militia forces were organised in the reign of King Charles II but it was not until 1715 that the Irish Militia came under statutory authority. During the 18th Century there were various Volunteer Associations and unofficial militia units controlled by the landowners, concerned mainly with internal security. During the War of American Independence, the threat of invasion by the Americans' allies, France and Spain, appeared to be serious. While most of the Regular Army was fighting overseas, the coasts of England and Wales were defended by the embodied Militia, but Ireland had no equivalent force. The Parliament of Ireland passed a Militia Act, but this failed to create an effective force. However it opened the way for the paramilitary Irish Volunteers to fill the gap. The Volunteers were outside the control of either the parliament or the Dublin Castle administration. When the invasion threat receded they diminished in numbers but remained a political force. On the outbreak of the French Revolutionary War In 1793, the Irish administration passed an effective Militia Act that created an official Irish Militia, while the paramilitary volunteers were essentially banned. The new Act was based on existing English precedents, with the men conscripted by ballot to fill county quotas (paid substitutes were permitted) and the officers having to meet certain property qualifications.

== Royal Longford Militia ==
County Longford was given a quota of 260 men to find, and the Prince of Wales's Royal Longford Militia was formed at Newtown Forbes. The Governor of County Longford, George Forbes, 6th Earl of Granard, was commissioned as Lieutenant-Colonel Commandant of the battalion on 11 April 1793. (Note: Later he was listed as Colonel of the Regiment with the same seniority (25 April 1793) as the colonels of the larger regiments raised at the same time.) The officers misunderstood the quota and enrolled 40 non-commissioned officers (NCOs) in addition to the 260 privates in five companies; when the mistake was discovered in January 1794 the additional men were kept and the battalion's establishment was adjusted accordingly, organised as six companies.

=== French Revolutionary War ===
The French Revolutionary and Napoleonic Wars saw the British and Irish militia embodied for a whole generation, becoming regiments of full-time professional soldiers (though restricted to service in Britain or Ireland respectively), which the regular army increasingly saw as a prime source of recruits. They served in coast defences, manned garrisons, guarded prisoners of war, and carried out internal security duties.

The new Royal Longford Militia (RLM (Note: The abbreviations "R.L. Militia', 'R.L. Reg' and 'RLM' were in use as early as the 1790s.)) was embodied at Longford town on 6 June. for permanent service on 6 June 1793, arms and ammunition were issued and training began. In October the battalion marched out to be quartered at Kilkenny, under the overall command of Maj-Gen Crosbie, commanding Connaught District. In November a body of armed insurgents occupied a village close to Kilkenny, and a force consisting of one company of the RLM, a Troop of the 5th Dragoons and one gun was sent against them. The artillery fire failed to induce the insurgents to surrender, so the Longfords were sent in and carried the position at the point of the bayonet. The inexperienced troops were warmly congratulated.

In April 1794 the battalion moved its headquarters (HQ) to Dundalk with detachments at Kingscourt, Carrickmacross and Portadown to assist the civil powers. The main duty was searching for illicit stills and there were frequent fights to capture these, for which the troops were rewarded with a bounty. These and other disputes also led to scuffles with local people, including a least one death of a civilian. By 29 August 1794 the battalion was deployed with four companies at Carlow, one at Ballitore and one at Kilcullen Bridge. In October and November the companies were concentrated at Dublin. The Irish Militia was augmented in April 1795, County Longford's quota being increased to 460 men.

Trouble was expected and in May the troops were ordered to be ready to take the field at short notice. The RLM and other battalions were camped at Luttrellstown outside Dublin. In July the regiment was under orders to move to Maryborough, but was kept outside Dublin, with live ammunition issued, in case of an insurrection in the city. By early 1796 the city was quiet and the troop concentration. could be dispersed. In the spring the RLM were billeted across County Carlow and Queen's County, with HQ at Carlow and detachments at Castlecomer, Roscrea, Maryborough, Ballinakill, Ballyroan and Curragh Camp.

Anxiety about a possible French invasion grew during the autumn of 1796 and preparations were made for field operations. A large French expeditionary force appeared in Bantry Bay on 21 December and troops from all over Ireland were marched towards the threatened area: Crosbie sent his forces to cover Cork. On 25 December the RLM were ordered to march rapidly to Bandon, leaving behind their heavy baggage, sick, women and children. The men marched through severe winter weather without blankets, which had been sent from Dublin by boat but were delayed when the canal froze. After struggling through snowdrifts to Kilworth news arrived that the French fleet had been scattered by the winter storms. Several ships had been wrecked and none of the French troops succeeded in landing; there was no sign of a rising by the United Irishmen. The invasion was called off on 29 December, and the troop concentration was dispersed in early 1797. The RLM remained at Kilworth for a while to recruit, then when the weather improved it moved to Rathkeale in case the French made an attempt on Limerick.

Early in 1797 the light companies of the militia were detached to join composite battalions drawn from several militia regiments. The RLM contingent was attached to 1st Light Battalion, stationed at Kilkenny. The militia regiments were each issued with two light six-pounder 'battalion guns', with the gun detachments trained by the Royal Artillery. When the militiamen of 1793 reached the end of their four-year enlistment in 1797, most of the Irish regiments were able to maintain their numbers through re-enlistments (for a bounty). The RLM was augmented again in July 1797 (when Lord Granard's position as Colonel Commandant was confirmed) and its establishment now totalled 646 all ranks: this was achieved by recruiting for bounty rather than using the ballot.

=== Irish Rebellion ===
After spending the summer of 1797 in huts at Rathkeale, the RLM was transferred to Limerick in September. Early in 1798, with rebellion expected, the militia regiments were supplied with camp equipment, pioneers' tools, etc to be ready to take the field. Each detachment was ordered to remained concentrated and to place strong night picquets. From 4 April the RLM paraded twice a day in full marching order. On 9 April the regiment took part with the rest of the Limerick garrison in a coordinated sweep to disarm the province of Munster, destroying the captured arms. With Munster disarmed the regiment was moved to County Clare, with HQ at Ennis, and detachments at Clarecastle, Kilrush, Sixmilebridge, Newmarket-on-Fergus, Broadford, Tuamgraney and Tulla. The Earl of Granard was appointed officer commanding the county. The expected Irish Rebellion broke out in May 1798. At first the regiment was little affected, though foraging parties were placed under the command of officers ordered to avoid clashes with the populace, and the Earl of Granard was empowered to try civilians by court martial if necessary.

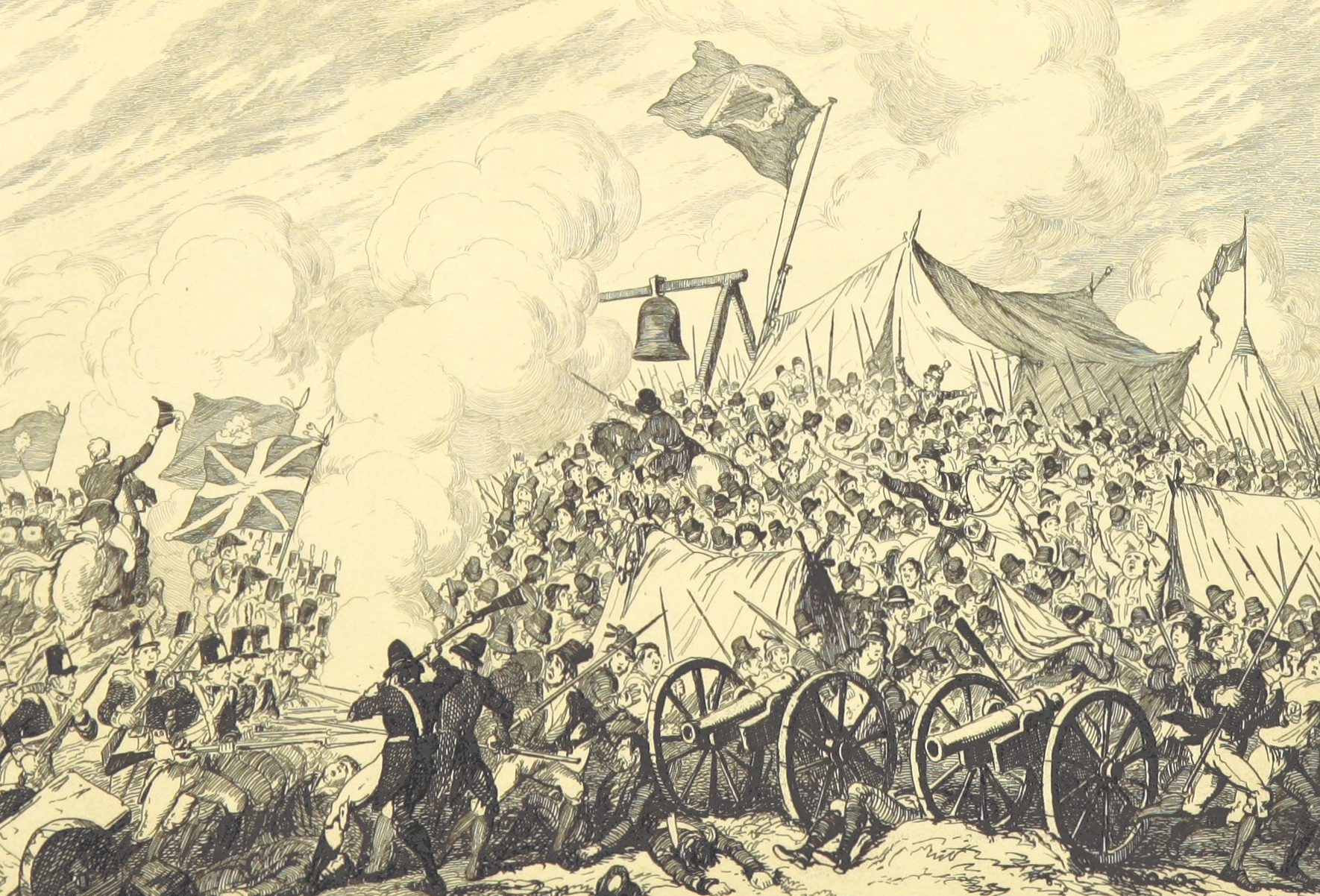
The Battle of Vinegar Hill, which the regiment fought in

Meanwhile, the Longford Company with the 1st Light Battalion was heavily engaged in the operations against the rebels in County Kildare and then moved into County Wicklow. It was part of the force assembled by Lt-Gen Gerard Lake to take the main rebel camp at Vinegar Hill, forming part of David Dundas's column. The battalion was in contact with the rebels at Kilcavan Hill on 18 June, and then formed the advanced guard at the decisive Battle of Vinegar Hill on 21 June, storming the rebel position on the heights. The Longford company suffered numerous casualties in the action.

After the rebellion had been largely put down, an expeditionary force under General Humbert sent by the French Directory to assist the rebels belatedly arrived at Killala on 22 August. Next day the British commanders began collecting troops to face this new threat: the RLM was ordered to concentrate and then march to Gort, leaving its heavy baggage at Ennis. The Earl of Granard promptly obeyed, leaving one company to protect the barracks at Ennis and Clarecastle, he marched out with his other four companies (14 officers and 400 other ranks (ORs)) and a battalion gun on the morning of 24 August. During the march he received messages from the commanders gathering the force to push on to Oranmore and then to Castlebar. The regiment reached Oranmore after dark on 25 August. Next morning it was ordered by Maj-Gen Hutchinson, commanding at Castlebar, to press on to that town 'with all possible despatch', requisitioning horses, carts and carriages to speed the journey. The regiment put the men's packs, blankets, greatcoats and those men who were unable to march aboard these. carts, and arrived at Castlebar at 23.00 on 26 August, having marched 80 miles from Ennis in three days. The baggage was parked in the market square and the exhausted men bivouacked in the street.

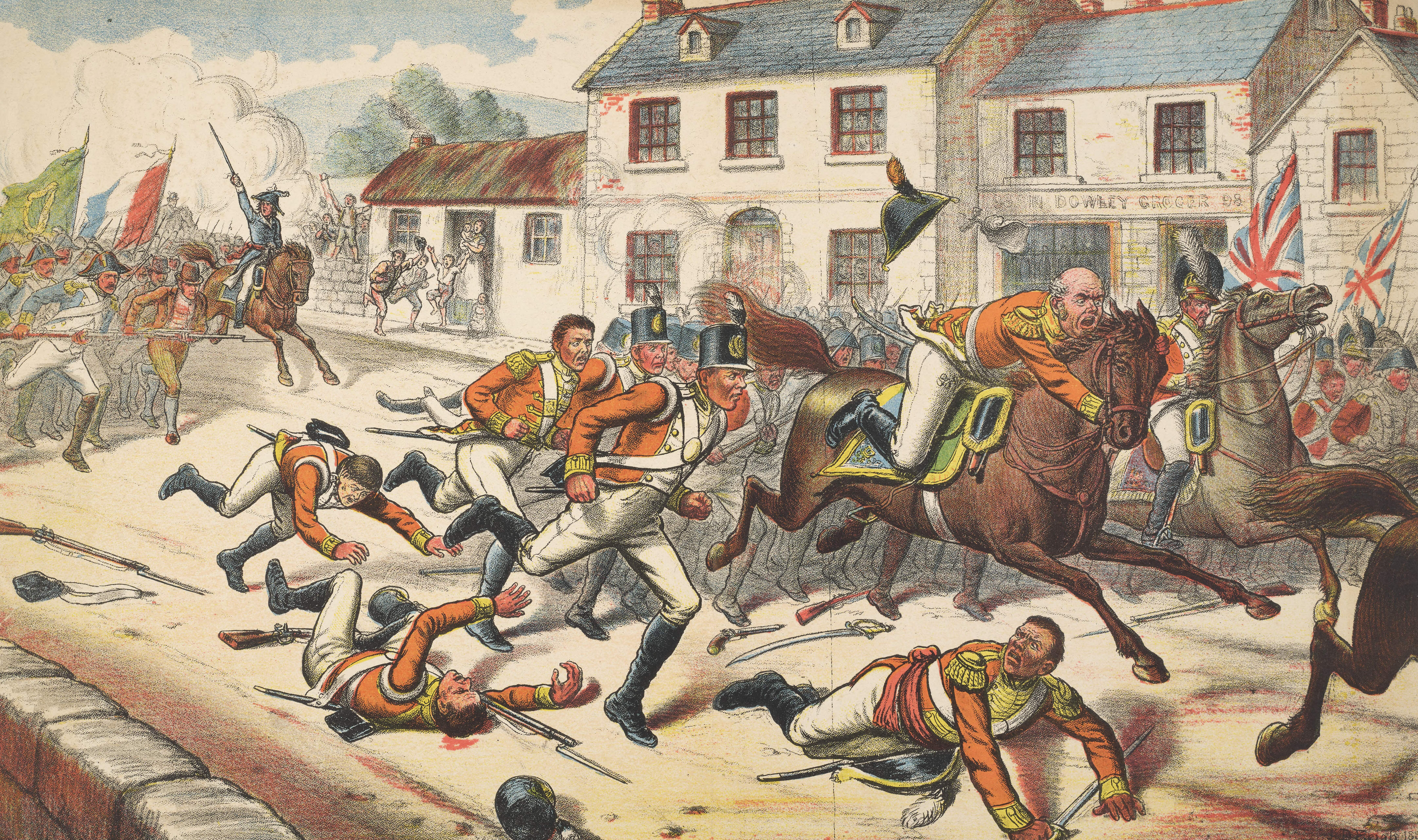
The Battle of Castlebar, at which the regiment was routed

The Kilkenny Militia had arrived at Castlebar the day before, and with the cadre of the 6th Foot, some of the 6th Dragoon Guards, and detachments from some yeomanry and fencible regiments, Hutchinson had about 1700 men, backed by four 6-pounders and a howitzer of the Royal Irish Artillery (RIA). However, the force drawn from more than 10 units had no cohesion, the militia were exhausted, and Hutchinson had made the mistake of concentrating within striking distance of the enemy. There were two routes to Castlebar from the French camp at Ballina: Humbert made a feint along the lower road, which was patrolled, but actually advanced along the other, which was considered impracticable. He attacked early on 27 August with 1,000 French troops and 3,000 rebels armed with French weapons. The Kilkenny Militia were in the first line on a ridge with Granard and his four companies of Royal Longford Militia in a valley to their left rear. Humbert attacked in column, and was driven back three times by the guns manned by the RIA and the Kilkennys. He then deployed his men into line, but the inexperienced Kilkenny Militia opened fire at too long a range and with Humbert's line rapidly extending to outflank them, they attempted to retire. To do this under fire was beyond the troops' capabilities, and the whole line gave way, exposing the gunners to being overrun, and fleeing past the Longfords behind the ridge. The Earl of Granard kept most of the Longfords in hand and with a few of the Kilkennys and fencibles who rallied to them, he managed to retire in reasonable order, firing volleys to cover the retreat of the force. Threatened with being enveloped, Granard retired to Castlebar Bridge in the town where, with the assistance of a gun manned by the RIA, he managed to hold on for about half an hour. However, the force that had retired into Castlebar was in complete confusion behind him and failed to rally there. Under crossfire from the houses across the bridge, all of the gunners were shot down and although Granard's men repulsed the first attempt by French Hussars to cross the bridge, their infantry came on and engaged in hand-to-hand fighting on the bridge while other parties waded across the river on either side. Granard retired, forming a rearguard for the broken army, which was fleeing across the countryside, giving rise to the battle's nickname, the 'Castlebar Races'. Granard and the remnants of the RLM reached Tuam the following morning All the army's baggage and cannons in Castlebar, and the regimental paymasters' chests, fell into the hands of the enemy. The RLM's losses totalled 55 ORs killed and four officers and 125 ORs captured, many of them wounded. Some 53 of the captured men may have entered French service in an attempt to save their lives, but were hanged or shot after being captured by government forces later in the campaign.

On 30 August Granard and his survivors fell back to Athlone. The regiment then formed part of the garrison there while government forces were gathered to defeat Humbert's force. Humbert made a stand at the Battle of Ballinamuck on 8 September, where he was attacked by the 1st Light Battalion as part of the advance guard. After a brisk fight Humbert surrendered to the overwhelming force. After that the rebellion was soon stamped out. 1st Light Battalion joined the Longford Militia in garrison at Athlione. The RLM left Athlone on 21 October and by 28 October were back in their old quarters at Ennis and Clarecastle. Over the following months recruiting parties went to Co Longford, and the lost baggage and equipment was slowly replaced. Although the rebellion was over, the country was still disturbed, Ennis had to be disarmed and the garrison was constantly ready to march out at short notice in support of the civil powers, escorting prisoners etc. Early in 1799 an attempt was made to sow dissension in the ranks of the regiment, when an anonymous letter was sent to the Lord Lieutenant of Ireland purporting to come from the Roman Catholics among the rank and file, complaining of ill-treatment by their Protestant officers. When this became known, the Catholic soldiers of the regiment unanimously signed a memorial disavowing the letter. In January 1800 the light battalions were broken up and the companies restored to their regiments.

With the diminishing threat of invasion after 1799, the strength of the militia could be reduced, and at the beginning of 1800 the surplus men were encouraged to volunteer for regiments of the line, and a large number of the RLM did so. In March 1800 the light battalions were reformed, the RLM being warned to make sure that its light company comprised men who had served before. It was later marched off to join the light battalion at Athlone. A composite corps of pioneers under the Quartermaster-General was also formed by detachments from the regiments. Each detachment comprised one subaltern, one sergeant, one corporal and 20 picked men, who received extra pay for the work. The Longford contingent served in the '3rd Division'. The rest of the RLM was held ready to march to Limerick in the event of trouble, though it was food riots that were the problem, not insurrection. Hunting for illicit stills and chasing mail coach robbers and smugglers were among its other duties: a detachment of the RLM attacked and chased away a Guernsey smuggling boat, but not before it had dropped its cargo at Lyscanner Bay. In July 1801 the threat of invasion had shifted to England, and a number of Irish Militia regiments (including 588 out of the 600 rank and file of the Royal Longfords), volunteered to serve there; however, nothing came of the proposal.

By the end of 1801 peace negotiations with the French were progressing and recruiting and re-enlistment for the Irish Militia was stopped in October. The men received the new clothing they were due on 25 December, but the Treaty of Amiens was signed in March 1802 when the regiment was disembodied. On 12 May the men of the RLM were paid off at Longford (which the Earl of Granard had nominated as the best barracks in which to store the arms), leaving only the permanent staff of 70 non-commissioned officers (NCOs) and drummers under the regimental adjutant.

=== Napoleonic Wars ===
However, the Peace of Amiens was short-lived and preparations to re-embody the militia were soon under way. Lord Granard was ordered to bring the regiment up to strength by means of the ballot in November 1802, and then to embody three companies on 15 March 1803. Another company followed on 1 April and the other two completed the regiment on 6 April 1803. The RLM once more had an establishment of 400 all ranks, but in 1805 the Irish Militia were allowed to recruit an additional 30 volunteers per company.

Anti-invasion preparations were now put in hand. The RLM was considered ready for duty in August and went to its station at Fermoy. It moved to Cahir in November, and then to Clonmel in March 1804. 'Malignant fever' swept through the barracks at Clonmel, putting most of the men in hospital for a period, after which the regiment worked on the defences of the River Shannon. During the summer of 1805 as many men as possible of the RLM were trained to man the gun batteries. In October the regiment moved to Athlone for the winter, then in June 1806 to Ennis and Clarecastle. In April 1807 the RLM went to Ballinasloe and manned the Shannon batteries once more, before moving to Galway in July. In the autumn the government made strenuous efforts to get militiamen to transfer to the Regular army, but the authorities complained that few of the Longfords volunteered. At the end of the year the regiment moved into County Kerry, with HQ at Killarney and detachments scattered all over the disturbed county. There were numerous cases clashes between militiamen and local people in early 1808, particularly at Millstreet, but these settled down to a few cases of stones being thrown at the militiamen by the people of Killarney. In April 1809 the regiment moved to Roscrea, with detachments across County Tipperary. In December a sergeant's party from the company stationed at Nenagh employed on revenue duty was attacked at by a mob about 500 strong. The sergeant withdrew to a bridge and drew his men up, driving off the mob after killing one man. At the beginning of August 1810 the regiment was moved to Cork, where it formed part of the garrison for a year, latterly stationed at Midleton. In November 1811 it moved to Wexford, with the usual detachments across County Wexford. In 1811 the Irish Militia was augmented again by 30 men per company, and the establishment of the RLM was increased to 647 all ranks

=== England ===
An 'Interchange Act' was passed in July 1811 permitting British and Irish militia units to volunteer for service across the Irish Sea. By the end of July 34 out of 38 Irish militia regiments had volunteered for this service, including the RLM. In April 1813 the regiment was warned for a move to England and moved to Waterford, From there it sailed to Bristol at the beginning of June, arriving after a nine-day voyage. It established its HQ in the city and sent detachments to Gloucester and Worcester. The Irish militiamen found the locals inhospitable and rations scarce and expensive. By December the regiment was 143 men short of its establishment, having provided 132 volunteers to the regulars since April; the Lord Lieutenant proposed to reduce the regiment by one company but this was not taken up. In January 1814 the regiment commanded by George Fetherston (Major since 1810), moved to Coventry, with detachments at Northampton, Hinckley and Lichfield. Many of the men fell sick during the winter march in wet weather. The officers complained that they did not get the same expense allowances they had enjoyed in Ireland and which they had been promised. There was also trouble between the townsfolk and the militiamen at Northampton. In April the regiment concentrated at Warwick, and next month moved to Liverpool. The war had ended with the abdication of Napoleon, and the militia could be progressively disembodied. The RLM stayed at Liverpool until August, when it sailed to Dublin, then marched to be stationed at Kilbeggan, with the usual scattered detachments. In October the RLM concentrated at Longford, where it was disembodied on 10 October 1814.

Napoleon escaped from Elba in 1815 and the militia were called out again as the bulk of the regular army crossed to the Continent for the short Waterloo campaign and occupation duties in its aftermath. The RLM was re-embodied at Longford on 13 July 1815 (on the old establishment of 461 all ranks).It moved to Lifford in October, with a large number of small detachments. The RLM was finally disembodied on 15 April 1816.

=== Long Peace ===
After Waterloo there was a long peace. Although officers continued to be commissioned into the militia and ballots might still be held, the regiments were rarely assembled for training and the permanent staffs of militia regiments were progressively reduced. The regimental HQ and arms store for the RLM was at Newtown Forbes until 1817, then at Granard until returning to Newtown Forbes in 1821.

In 1824 The Earl of Granard handed over command of the disembodied RLM to his eldest son, Major-General, George Forbes, Viscount Forbes, Member of Parliament for County Longford. He was Lord Lieutenant of Longford from 1831. Major Fetherston (now Sir George Fetherston, 3rd Baronet, and also previously an MP for Longford]), who had commanded the RLM during its deployment to England, was promoted to Lieutenant-Colonel on 1 January 1833. Viscount Forbes died in 1836, a few months before his father. Henry White, who had served in the 15th Light Dragoons during the Peninsular War, was then appointed colonel on 9 January 1837. He was later Lord Lieutenant of Longford and was created Lord Annaly in 1863.

== 1852 Reforms ==
The Militia of the United Kingdom was revived by the Militia Act 1852, enacted during a renewed period of international tension. As before, units were raised and administered on a county basis, and filled by voluntary enlistment (although conscription by means of the Militia Ballot might be used if the counties failed to meet their quotas). Training was for 56 days on enlistment, then for 21–28 days per year, during which the men received full army pay. Under the Act, Militia units could be embodied by Royal Proclamation for full-time home defence service in three circumstances:

1. 'Whenever a state of war exists between Her Majesty and any foreign power'.
2. 'In all cases of invasion or upon imminent danger thereof'.
3. 'In all cases of rebellion or insurrection'.

=== Royal Longford Rifles ===
Colonel White, as Lord Lieutenant of Longford, was ordered to procure volunteers to revive his regiment. The adjutant, who had held the position since 1809, was retired, and he and other elderly officers were replaced by younger men. A large expeditionary force having been sent to the Crimea during 1854, the militia began to be called out. The revived RLM was embodied at Longford Barracks on 26 December 1854, with 435 all ranks in four companies. On that day the regiment was converted into a rifle corps and took the name Prince of Wales's Royal Longford Rifles (RLR). Later, in 1858, the regiment's right to the 'Royal' title was questioned, but the retired adjutant was able to show that it had been used unquestioned since 1796. (Note: Two sources claim that the regiment was converted again from rifles to light infantry in 1855, but there is no support for this statement in either the regimental history or the Army List.)

The regiment began training, with drill instructors provided by the 68th Foot stationed at Birr. However, no uniforms or equipment arrived for several months, the colonel having to provide fatigue dress and greatcoats for winter training. By mid-March Lt-Col Musters reported that he had completed the regimental quota and that there were sufficient volunteers to return the regiment to a strength of six companies. Seventy rifles were received at the end of March, but it was not until the end of May that the regiment was fully armed and equipped. The officers and men had already volunteered for garrison duty in. the Mediterranean, but this offer was not accepted; instead, 100 men transferred to the regulars. Leaving a small depot at Longford, the regiment moved on 16 and 17 April to the barracks at Athlone with the Westmeath Rifles, where the two regiments continued their training. In July they were considered trained, and moved to Curragh Camp. A month later the RLR moved to Clarecastle, but finding the barracks insanitary, the regiment shifted to Ennis, where the barracks were equally unhealthy. Nevertheless, the regiment remained, trying to make the barracks habitable, with 100 recruits at Clarecastle. Further groups of volunteers left for the regulars, but were quickly replaced by fresh enlistments. The Crimean War ended with the Treaty of Paris on 30 March 1856, and at the end of May the RLR marched back to Longford, where it was quartered in the Cavalry Barracks. Because the men were finding it difficult to get alternative work, Lt-Col Musters was permitted to delay the final disembodiment until 18 August.

From 1858 until 1865 the RLR assembled at the Upper or Cavalry Barracks at Longford for 21 (later 27) days' annual training. There was no training for the Irish Militia from 1866 to 1870 at the time of the Fenian crisis. The militia regiments now had a large cadre of permanent staff (about 30) and a number of the officers were former Regulars. Around a third of the recruits and many young officers went on to join the Regular Army. The Militia Reserve introduced in 1867 consisted of present and former militiamen who undertook to serve overseas in case of war. They were called out in 1878 during the international crisis caused by the Russo-Turkish War.

== Cardwell and Childers Reforms ==
Under the 'Localisation of the Forces' scheme introduced by the Cardwell Reforms of 1872, militia regiments were brigaded with their local linked regular regiments. For the RLR this was in Sub-District No 67 (Counties of Meath, Westmeath and Longford, and King's and Queen's Counties) in Dublin District of Irish Command:

- 100th (Prince of Wales's Royal Canadian) Regiment of Foot
- 109th (Bombay Infantry) Regiment of Foot
- Royal Longford Rifles
- King's County Rifles
- Queen's County Rifles
- Westmeath Rifles
- Royal Meath Militia
- No 67 Brigade Depot was formed in April 1873 at Birr, the King's County Militia's HQ.

Although often referred to as brigades, the sub-districts were purely administrative organisations, but in a continuation of the Cardwell Reforms a mobilisation scheme began to appear in the Army List from December 1875. This assigned Regular and Militia units to places in an order of battle of corps, divisions and brigades for the 'Active Army', even though these formations were entirely theoretical, with no staff or services assigned. The Royal Longford Rifles were assigned to 1st Brigade of 2nd Division, V Corps. The division would have mustered at Warminster in Wiltshire in time of war.

The regiment continued its round of annual training (except in 1881–82), usually at Longford but at Mullingar in 1873, on Salisbury Plain in 1876 and at Curragh Camp in 1885. A fifth company was added to the regiment in 1873.

=== 6th Battalion, Rifle Brigade ===
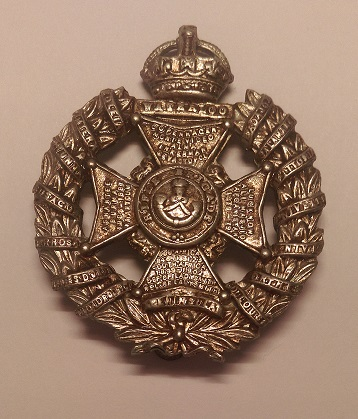
Rifle Brigade cap badge.

The Childers Reforms took Cardwell's reforms further, with the militia regiments becoming numbered battalions of their linked regiments. However, there were more Irish militia regiments than were required by the Irish regular regiments, so the Royal Longford and Westmeath Rifles were split from the Leinster Regiment (as the 100th and 109th became) and instead were assigned to the Rifle Brigade, which had no county affiliation but recruited nationally. This large regiment now consisted of:

- 1st–4th Battalions – Regular
- 5th Battalion – Queen's Own Tower Hamlets Militia at Bethnal Green, London
- 6th Battalion – Royal Longford Rifles at Longford
- 7th Battalion – King's Own Royal Tower Hamlets Light Infantry at Dalston, London
- 8th Battalion – Leitrim Rifles at Carrick-on-Shannon
- 9th Battalion – Westmeath Rifles at Mullingar

Formally, the regiment became the 6th (Royal Longford Militia) Battalion, Rifle Brigade (The Prince Consort's Own) on 1 July 1881. The Rifle Brigade Depot was at Peninsula Barracks, Winchester, but the militia battalions retained their own headquarters.

On 1 April 1899 the battalion amalgamated with the 9th (Westmeath Rifles) Battalion to form the 6th (Royal Longford and Westmeath Militia) Battalion

The combined battalion was embodied from 5 December 1899 to 3 December 1900 for home defence duties during the Second Boer War.

== Disbandment ==
After the Boer War, the future of the militia was called into question. There were moves to reform the Auxiliary Forces (Militia, Yeomanry and Volunteers) to take their place in the six Army Corps proposed by the Secretary of State for War, St John Brodrick. However, little of Brodrick's scheme was carried out. Under the more sweeping Haldane Reforms of 1908, the Militia was replaced by the Special Reserve (SR), a semi-professional force whose role was to provide reinforcement drafts for regular units serving overseas in wartime, rather like the earlier Militia Reserve. The 6th (Royal Longford & Westmeath Militia) Battalion did not transfer to the Special Reserve and was disbanded on 31 July 1908. The 7th Bn Rifle Brigade (the former King's Own Light Infantry Militia) did transfer to the SR and was renumbered as the 6th (Extra Reserve) Battalion.

== Commanders ==
=== Colonels ===
The following served as Colonel of the Regiment:

- Gen George Forbes, 6th Earl of Granard, with precedence of 25 April 1793
- Maj-Gen George Forbes, Viscount Forbes, son of the above, appointed 1824, died 1836
- Lt-Col Henry White, later Lord Annaly, appointed 9 January 1837 died 1873

=== Lieutenant-Colonels ===
Lieutenant-Colonels of the regiment (COs from 1852) included:

- George Forbes, 6th Earl of Granard, Lt-Col Commandant 11 April 1793, later promoted to Colonel
- Samuel Ahmuty, appointed 14 April 1797, retired September 1806
- Hon Henry Forbes, brother of the Earl of Granard and formerly in the Buckinghamshire Militia for 12 years, appointed September 1806
- Sir George Fetherston, 3rd Baronet, promoted 1 January 1833, died 12 July 1853
- H. Musters
- Hon Luke White (later 2nd Lord Annaly), former captain, 13th Dragoons, appointed 2 March 1859, retired 14 June 1884
- John Thomas Davys, first commissioned into the regiment as an Ensign on 18 January 1856, promoted 14 June 1884; retired 27 August 1887, later Hon Col
- James H. Dopping, first commissioned into the regiment as a Lieutenant 6 December 1864, promoted 27 August 1887
- C.E. Lefroy, first commissioned into the regiment as a lieutenant 9 May 1877, promoted 23 December 1893, retired 23 December 1898
- John Richard Malone, former lieutenant, 12th Lancers, appointed (to 9th Bn) 25 August 1886
- E.W. Purdon, formerly 9th Bn, promoted 4 July 1900, retired 16 January 1901
- Gilbert L.J.J.G. Nugent, formerly 9th Bn, appointed 16 February 1901

=== Honorary Colonels ===
The following served as Honorary Colonel of the battalion:

- John Thomas Davys, former CO, appointed 3 August 1889
- James H. Dopping, former CO, appointed 6 November 1895

=== Other notable officers ===
- Maj Samuel Blackall, former lieutenant,85th Foot, later Lieutenant-Governor of Dominica
- John Vallentin, commissioned Second lieutenant 9 August 1899, later transferred to a Regular commission. with the South Staffordshire Regiment and won a posthumous Victoria Cross at the First Battle of Ypres

== Heritage & ceremonial ==
=== Uniforms & insignia ===
On first formation the regiment's uniform was scarlet with blue facings appropriate to a 'Royal' regiment. The badge was the Prince of Wales's feathers. One source from the long period of disembodiment 1816–52 suggests that the regiment bore yellow facings, but there is no corroboration for this. When the regiment became a rifle corps in 1854 the uniform changed to Rifle green with scarlet facings appropriate to a 'Royal' rifle regiment. When the RLR was assembled for training in 1858 it found that the uniforms supplied were for other rifle militia regiments, and Lt-Col Musters declined to clothe his men until uniforms with the correct red facings arrived. When it became a battalion of the Rifle Brigade in 1881, the RLM adopted the black facings and insignia of that regiment.

=== Precedence ===
On the outbreak of the French Revolutionary War the English counties had drawn lots to determine the relative precedence of their militia regiments. In 1798 the new Irish militia regiments received their own table of precedence, in which County Longford came 15th. In 1833 King William IV drew the lots to determine an order of precedence for the whole of the United Kingdom. Those regiments raised before 1783 took the first 69 places, followed by the 60 regiments (including those in Ireland) raised for the French Revolutionary War: the Royal Longford took 85th place, and this remained unchanged when the list was updated in 1855. Most regiments took little notice of the numeral.

== See also ==
- Irish Militia
- Militia (United Kingdom)
- Rifle Brigade (The Prince Consort's Own)
