= County Longford (UK Parliament constituency) =

UK parliamentary constituency in Ireland, 1801–1885 and 1918–1922

- Former county constituency for the House of Commons
- County: County Longford

1801–1885
- Seats: 2
- Created from: Longford (IHC)
- Replaced by: North Longford; South Longford

1918–1922
- Seats: 1
- Created from: North Longford; South Longford
- Replaced by: Longford–Westmeath

County Longford was a parliamentary constituency in Ireland, which returned two Members of Parliament (MPs) to the House of Commons of the Parliament of the United Kingdom from 1801 to 1885, and one MP from 1918 to 1922.

== Boundaries ==
This constituency comprised the whole of County Longford.

== Members of Parliament ==
=== MPs 1801–1885 ===
Year	1st Member	1st Party	2nd Member	2nd Party
1801, 1 January	Sir William Gleadowe-Newcomen, Bt		Sir Thomas Fetherston, Bt	
1802, 15 July	Hon. Thomas Gleadowe-Newcomen		Sir Thomas Fetherston, Bt	
1806, 25 November	Viscount George Forbes	Whig	Sir Thomas Fetherston, Bt	
1819, 15 October	Viscount George Forbes	Whig	Sir George Fetherston, Bt	Tory
1830, 11 August	Viscount George Forbes	Tory	Anthony Lefroy	Tory
1832, 22 December	Luke White	Repeal Association	James Halpin Rorke	Repeal Association
1833, 2 April	Viscount George Forbes	Tory	Anthony Lefroy	Tory
1834, 18 December	Viscount George Forbes	Conservative	Anthony Lefroy	Conservative
1836, 30 December	Luke White	Repeal Association	Anthony Lefroy	Conservative
1837, 5 May	Charles Fox	Conservative	Anthony Lefroy	Conservative
1837, 18 August	Luke White	Repeal Association	Henry White	Repeal Association
1842, 18 April	Anthony Lefroy	Conservative	Henry White	Repeal Association
1847, 13 August	Samuel Blackall	Repeal Association	Richard Maxwell Fox	Repeal Association
1851, 21 April	Richard More O'Ferrall	Whig	Richard Maxwell Fox	Repeal Association
1852, 19 July	Fulke Greville-Nugent	Ind. Irish	Richard Maxwell Fox	Ind. Irish
1856, 13 May	Fulke Greville-Nugent	Ind. Irish	Henry George Hughes	Whig
1857, 16 April	Fulke Greville-Nugent	Whig	Henry White	Whig
1859, 9 May	Fulke Greville-Nugent	Liberal	Henry White	Liberal
1861, 4 July	Fulke Greville-Nugent	Liberal	Luke White	Liberal
1862, 7 March	Fulke Greville-Nugent	Liberal	Myles O'Reilly	Liberal
1869, 31 December	Hon. Reginald Greville-Nugent	Liberal	Myles O'Reilly	Liberal
1870, 16 May	Hon. George Greville-Nugent	Liberal	Myles O'Reilly	Liberal
1874, 12 February	George Errington	Home Rule League	Myles O'Reilly	Home Rule League
1879, 5 April	George Errington	Home Rule League	Justin McCarthy	Home Rule League
1885	Constituency divided: see North Longford and South Longford			

=== MPs 1918–1922 ===
Election	Member	Party	Note
1918	Single member constituency created		
1918, December 14	Joseph McGuinness	Sinn Féin	Did not take his seat at Westminster
1922, May 31	Seat left vacant after the death of McGuinness		
1922, October 26	UK constituency abolished. Succeeded by Longford–Westmeath constituency in Dáil Éireann		

== Elections ==
=== Elections in the 1800s ===
MPs co-opted from the Irish Parliament, 1801: Longford (2 seats)
Party	Candidate	Votes	%	±%
Tory	Sir Thomas Fetherston, Bt	Unopposed	N/A	N/A
Tory	Sir William Gleadowe-Newcomen, Bt	Unopposed	N/A	N/A

General election 1802: Longford (2 seats)
Party	Candidate	Votes	%	±%
Tory	Sir Thomas Fetherston, Bt	Unopposed	N/A	N/A
Tory	Hon. Thomas Gleadowe-Newcomen	Unopposed	N/A	N/A
Tory hold				
Tory hold				

General election 1806: Longford (2 seats)
Party	Candidate	Votes	%	±%
Tory	Sir Thomas Fetherston, Bt	Unopposed	N/A	N/A
Whig	Viscount George Forbes	Unopposed	N/A	N/A
Tory hold				
Whig gain from Tory				

General election 1807: Longford (2 seats)
Party	Candidate	Votes	%	±%
Tory	Sir Thomas Fetherston, Bt	Unopposed	N/A	N/A
Whig	Viscount George Forbes	Unopposed	N/A	N/A
Tory hold				
Whig hold				

=== Elections in the 1810s ===
General election 1812: Longford (2 seats)
Party	Candidate	Votes	%	±%
Tory	Sir Thomas Fetherston, Bt	Unopposed	N/A	N/A
Whig	Viscount George Forbes	Unopposed	N/A	N/A
Tory hold				
Whig hold				

General election 1818: Longford (2 seats)
Party	Candidate	Votes	%	±%
Tory	Sir Thomas Fetherston, Bt	Unopposed	N/A	N/A
Whig	Viscount George Forbes	Unopposed	N/A	N/A
Tory hold				
Whig hold				

Sir Thomas Fetherston died, causing a by-election.

1819 County Longford by-election: Longford (1 seat)
Party	Candidate	Votes	%	±%
Tory	Sir George Fetherston, Bt	618	62.5	N/A
Whig	Luke White	371	37.5	N/A
Majority		247	25.0	N/A
Turnout		989		N/A
Registered electors				
Tory hold				

=== Elections in the 1820s ===
General election 1820: Longford (2 seats)
Party	Candidate	Votes	%	±%
Tory	Sir George Fetherston, Bt	Unopposed	N/A	N/A
Whig	Viscount George Forbes	Unopposed	N/A	N/A
Tory hold				
Whig hold				

General election 1826: Longford (2 seats)
Party	Candidate	Votes	%	±%
Tory	Sir George Fetherston, Bt	Unopposed	N/A	N/A
Whig	Viscount George Forbes	Unopposed	N/A	N/A
Tory hold				
Whig hold				

=== Elections in the 1830s ===
General election 1830: Longford (2 seats)
Party	Candidate	Votes	%
Tory	George Forbes	Unopposed	
Tory	Anthony Lefroy	Unopposed	
Registered electors		367	
Tory hold			
Tory gain from Whig			

General election 1831: Longford (2 seats)
Party	Candidate	Votes	%
Tory	George Forbes	211	37.6
Tory	Anthony Lefroy	202	36.0
Whig	Luke White	130	23.2
Whig	Joseph Denis Mullen	18	3.2
Majority		72	12.8
Turnout		c. 281	c. 76.6
Registered electors		367	
Tory hold			
Tory hold			

General election 1832: Longford (2 seats)
Party	Candidate	Votes	%	±%
Repeal	Luke White	649	26.3	+3.1
Repeal	James Halpin Rourke	645	26.2	New
Tory	George Forbes	587	23.8	−13.8
Tory	Anthony Lefroy	582	23.6	−12.4
Majority		58	2.4	N/A
Turnout		1,255	97.0	c. +20.4
Registered electors		1,294		
Repeal gain from Tory		Swing	+8.1	
Repeal gain from Tory		Swing	N/A	

On petition, a House of Commons Select Committee inquiry disqualified 73 votes and declared Forbes and Lefroy the winners of the election.

General election 1835: Longford (2 seats)
Party	Candidate	Votes	%	±%
Conservative	Viscount George Forbes	797	43.5	+19.7
Conservative	Anthony Lefroy	549	30.0	+6.4
Repeal (Whig)	Luke White	424	23.2	−3.0
Repeal (Whig)	Henry White	61	3.3	−22.9
Majority		125	6.8	N/A
Turnout		987	62.4	−34.6
Registered electors		1,581		
Conservative gain from Repeal		Swing	+16.4	
Conservative gain from Repeal		Swing	+9.7	

Viscount Forbes died, causing a by-election.

By-election, 30 December 1836: Longford (1 seat)
Party	Candidate	Votes	%	±%
Repeal (Whig)	Luke White	619	54.1	+27.6
Conservative	Charles Fox (Irish politician)	526	45.9	−27.6
Majority		93	8.2	N/A
Turnout		1,145	c. 72.4	c. +10.0
Registered electors		c. 1,581		
Repeal gain from Conservative		Swing	+27.6	

On petition, a House of Commons committee inquiry disqualified 94 votes and declared Fox the winner of the election by a majority of 1.

General election 1837: Longford (2 seats)
Party	Candidate	Votes	%	±%
Repeal (Whig)	Luke White	671	27.3	+4.1
Repeal (Whig)	Henry White	667	27.2	+23.9
Conservative	Anthony Lefroy	561	22.9	−7.1
Conservative	Charles Fox (Irish politician)	556	22.6	−20.9
Majority		106	4.3	N/A
Turnout		1,257	72.4	+10.0
Registered electors		1,736		
Repeal gain from Conservative		Swing	+9.1	
Repeal gain from Conservative		Swing	+19.0	

=== Elections in the 1840s ===
General election 1841: Longford (2 seats)
Party	Candidate	Votes	%	±%
Repeal	Luke White	621	36.0	+8.7
Repeal	Henry White	621	36.0	+8.8
Conservative	Anthony Lefroy	482	28.0	−17.5
Majority		139	8.0	+3.7
Turnout		1,102	70.2	−2.2
Registered electors		1,569		
Repeal hold		Swing	+8.7	
Repeal hold		Swing	+8.8	

On petition, a House of Commons committee began an inquiry into the votes cast for Luke White, but he withdrew his candidacy after 1 vote was examined and Lefroy was declared elected on 18 April 1842 .

General election 1847: Longford (2 seats)
Party	Candidate	Votes	%	±%
Repeal	Samuel Blackall	447	28.7	−7.3
Repeal	Richard Maxwell Fox	433	27.8	−8.2
Conservative	Anthony Lefroy	352	22.6	+8.6
Conservative	Lawrence Harman King-Harman	323	20.8	+6.8
Majority		81	5.2	−2.8
Turnout		778 (est)	64.2 (est)	−6.0
Registered electors		1,211		
Repeal hold		Swing	−7.5	
Repeal hold		Swing	−8.0	

=== Elections in the 1850s ===
Blackall was appointed Lieutenant-Governor of Dominica, causing a by-election.

By-election, 21 April 1851: Longford (1 seat)
Party	Candidate	Votes	%	±%
Whig	Richard More O'Ferrall	938	92.1	N/A
Conservative	George Warner Wilson Sleator	80	7.9	−35.5
Majority		858	84.2	N/A
Turnout		1,018	43.9	−20.3
Registered electors		2,321		
Whig gain from Repeal		Swing		

General election 1852: Longford (2 seats)
Party	Candidate	Votes	%	±%
Independent Irish	Fulke Greville	1,066	51.1	N/A
Independent Irish	Richard Maxwell Fox	1,019	48.9	+21.1
Conservative	Lawrence Harman King-Harman	0	0.0	−43.4
Majority		1,109	48.9	N/A
Turnout		1,043 (est)	44.9 (est)	−19.3
Registered electors		2,321		
Independent Irish gain from Repeal		Swing		
Independent Irish gain from Repeal		Swing		

Fox's death caused a by-election.

By-election, 13 May 1856: Longford (1 seat)
Party	Candidate	Votes	%	±%
Whig	Henry George Hughes	Unopposed		
Whig gain from Independent Irish				

General election 1857: Longford (2 seats)
Party	Candidate	Votes	%	±%
Whig	Henry White	1,561	44.9	N/A
Whig	Fulke Greville	1,197	34.4	N/A
Whig	William Francis Forbes	722	20.7	N/A
Majority		475	13.6	N/A
Turnout		1,740 (est)	67.5 (est)	N/A
Registered electors		2,577		
Whig gain from Independent Irish		Swing	N/A	
Whig gain from Independent Irish		Swing	N/A	

General election 1859: Longford (2 seats)
Party	Candidate	Votes	%	±%
Liberal	Henry White	Unopposed		
Liberal	Fulke Greville	Unopposed		
Registered electors		2,869		
Liberal hold				
Liberal hold				

=== Elections in the 1860s ===
White's resignation caused a by-election.

By-election, 4 July 1861: Longford (1 seat)
Party	Candidate	Votes	%	±%
Liberal	Luke White	Unopposed		
Liberal hold				

White was appointed a Lord Commissioner of the Treasury, requiring a by-election.

By-election, 7 March 1862: Longford (1 seat)
Party	Candidate	Votes	%	±%
Liberal	Myles O'Reilly	1,468	62.2	N/A
Liberal	Luke White	892	37.8	N/A
Majority		576	24.4	N/A
Turnout		2,360	82.5	N/A
Registered electors		2,861		
Liberal hold				

General election 1865: Longford (2 seats)
Party	Candidate	Votes	%	±%
Liberal	Myles O'Reilly	Unopposed		
Liberal	Fulke Greville	Unopposed		
Registered electors		2,767		
Liberal hold				
Liberal hold				

General election 1868: Longford (2 seats)
Party	Candidate	Votes	%	±%
Liberal	Myles O'Reilly	Unopposed		
Liberal	Fulke Greville-Nugent	Unopposed		
Registered electors		2,815		
Liberal hold				
Liberal hold				

Greville-Nugent was created Lord Greville, causing a by-election.

By-election, 31 December 1869: Longford (1 seat)
Party	Candidate	Votes	%	±%
Liberal	Reginald Greville-Nugent	1,578	79.3	N/A
Ind. Nationalist	John Martin	411	20.7	New
Majority		1,167	58.6	N/A
Turnout		1,989	70.7	N/A
Registered electors		2,815		
Liberal hold				

=== Elections in the 1870s ===
On petition, Greville-Nugent was unseated.

By-election, 16 May 1870: Longford (1 seat)
Party	Candidate	Votes	%	±%
Liberal	George Greville-Nugent	1,217	56.9	N/A
Home Rule	Edward King-Harman	923	43.1	New
Majority		294	13.8	N/A
Turnout		2,140	76.0	N/A
Registered electors		2,815		
Liberal hold				

General election 1874: Longford (2 seats)
Party	Candidate	Votes	%	±%
Home Rule	Myles O'Reilly	1,811	45.2	N/A
Home Rule	George Errington	1,740	43.4	N/A
Liberal-Conservative	George Slator	432	10.8	N/A
Home Rule	James McCalmont	26	0.6	N/A
Majority		1,308	32.6	N/A
Turnout		2,018 (est)	73.3 (est)	N/A
Registered electors		2,753		
Home Rule gain from Liberal				
Home Rule gain from Liberal				

O'Reilly was appointed Assistant Commissioner of Intermediate Education and resigned, causing a by-election.

By-election, 4 Apr 1879: Longford (1 seat)
Party	Candidate	Votes	%	±%
Home Rule	Justin McCarthy	Unopposed		
Registered electors		2,640		
Home Rule hold				

=== Elections in the 1880s ===
General election 1880: Longford (2 seats)
Party	Candidate	Votes	%	±%
Home Rule	George Errington	Unopposed		
Parnellite Home Rule League	Justin McCarthy	Unopposed		
Registered electors		2,626		
Home Rule hold				
Home Rule hold				

=== Elections in the 1910s ===
1918 general election: Longford
Party	Candidate	Votes	%	±%
Sinn Féin	Joseph McGuinness	11,122	72.7	
Irish Parliamentary	J. P. Farrell	4,173	27.5	
Majority		6,949	45.2	
Turnout		15,295	74.8	
Registered electors		20,449		
Sinn Féin win (new seat)				
