= George Greville-Nugent =

Irish Liberal politician

George Greville-Nugent MP

Member of Parliament for County Longford
- In office 16 May 1870 – 31 January 1874 Serving with Myles O'Reilly
- Preceded by: Myles O'Reilly; Reginald Greville-Nugent
- Succeeded by: George Errington; Justin McCarthy

Personal details
- Born: 11 September 1842
- Died: 11 May 1897 (aged 54)
- Party: Liberal
- Spouse: Cecil Aitcheson Hankey
- Parent(s): Fulke Greville-Nugent; Rosa Emily Mary Anne Nugent

The Hon. George Frederick Nugent Greville-Nugent (11 September 1842 – 11 May 1897), known as George Greville from 1883 to his death, was an Irish Liberal politician.

Greville-Nugent was the son of Fulke Greville-Nugent, 1st Baron Greville who was Liberal MP for County Longford from 1852 and 1869, and brother of Reginald Greville-Nugent who was also elected for the seat in 1868.

Upon his brother's unseating in 1870, Greville-Nugent was elected for the same seat at a by-election in 1870. However, he did not contest the next general election in 1874.

Parliament of the United Kingdom
Preceded by Myles O'Reilly; Reginald Greville-Nugent	Member of Parliament for County Longford; 1870 – 1874; With: Myles O'Reilly	Succeeded by George Errington; Justin McCarthy
