= William O'Reilly (MP) =

Irish politician (1792–1844)

William Joseph O'Reilly (1792–1844) was Whig Member of Parliament from 1832 to 1835 in the Parliament of the United Kingdom for the Irish constituency of Dundalk. He was succeeded, unopposed, in the seat by the Radical William Sharman Crawford.

He was born the third son of Matthew O'Reilly of Knock Abbey Castle (previously known as Thomastown Castle), County Louth. He inherited the castle on the death of his elder brother Matthew in 1841.

He had married in 1820 his cousin Margaret, the daughter of Dowell O'Reilly of Tullymore and had a son and heir Myles O'Reilly, who fought on the continent for the Pope and was later also an MP, and an unmarried daughter Margaret.

His grandson was also named William Joseph O'Reilly (born 1864) who in turn inherited the Knock Abbey Castle estate from Myles. He served as Commissioner of Education in Ireland.

Parliament of the United Kingdom
Preceded by James Edward Gordon	Member of Parliament for Dundalk; 1832 – 1835	Succeeded by William Sharman Crawford
