= Reginald Greville-Nugent =

Irish politician

The Honourable Reginald Greville-Nugent
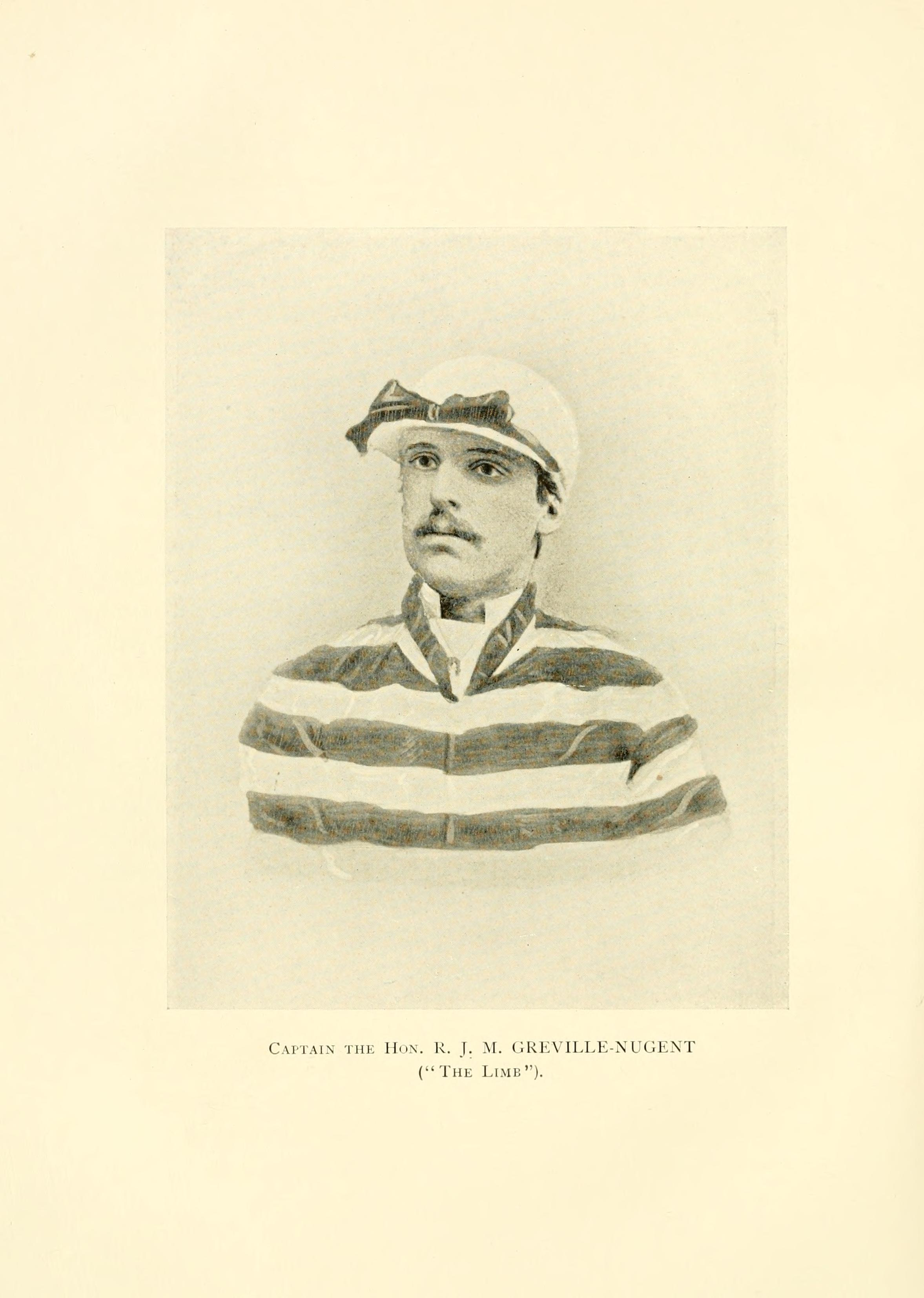
- From Gentlemen riders past and present (1909)

Member of Parliament for County Longford
- In office 1869–1870 Serving with Myles O'Reilly (1869–1870)
- Preceded by: Fulke Greville-Nugent; Myles O'Reilly
- Succeeded by: Myles O'Reilly; George Greville-Nugent

Personal details
- Born: Reginald James Macartney Greville; 27 November 1848
- Died: 28 February 1878 (aged 29) Sandown Park
- Spouse: Louisa Maud Yarde-Buller (m. 1871)
- Relations: Algernon Greville, 2nd Baron Greville (brother); George Greville-Nugent (brother)
- Children: Reginald Charles Fulke Greville
- Parent(s): Fulke Greville-Nugent, 1st Baron Greville; Lady Rosa Nugent

The Honourable Reginald James Macartney Greville-Nugent (27 November 1848 – 28 February 1878) was an Irish politician, the younger son of Fulke Greville-Nugent, 1st Baron Greville.

== Early life ==
Algernon was the fourth of five sons born to the former Lady Rosa Nugent and Fulke Greville-Nugent, 1st Baron Greville. His brothers were Hon. George Greville-Nugent MP (who married Cecil Aitcheson Hankey, a daughter of Lt Gen Henry Aitchison Hankey), Hon. Robert Southwell Greville-Nugent (who died unmarried), Capt. Hon. Reginald Greville-Nugent (who married Louisa Maud Buller-Yarde-Buller, sister of John Yarde-Buller, 1st Baron Churston and daughter of Sir Francis Buller-Yarde-Buller, 2nd Baronet), and Hon. Patrick Greville-Nugent, of Clonyn Castle, the High Sheriff of Westmeath (who married Ermengarde Ogilvy). His sister was Hon Mildred Charlotte Greville-Nugent, who married Alexis Huchet, Marquis de la Bedoyére.

His mother was the only daughter and heir of George Nugent, 1st Marquess of Westmeath and, his first wife, Lady Emily Cecil (second daughter of James Cecil, 1st Marquess of Salisbury). His paternal grandparents were Algernon Greville, of North Lodge in Hertford and the former Caroline Graham (daughter of Sir Bellingham Graham, 6th Baronet).

== Career ==
He held the Irish parliamentary seat of County Longford, vacated by his father on his elevation to the peerage, from 31 December 1869, defeating John Martin. He had to relinquish the seat in May 1870 due to Judge Fitzgerald overturning the election result on the grounds of voting irregularities.

== Personal life ==
On 21 October 1871, he was married to Louisa Maud Yarde-Buller, sister of John Yarde-Buller, 1st Baron Churston and daughter of Sir Francis Buller-Yarde-Buller, 2nd Baronet.

He was killed in 1878 after a fall in a steeplechase at Sandown Park.

His illegitimate son, Reginald Charles Fulke Greville, born 19 August 1866, was better known after changing his surname to Maugham (following a close friendship with the writer W. Somerset Maugham's great-aunt Julia) as the author of numerous books about Africa, and his most well-known work, Jersey under the Jack Boot.

Parliament of the United Kingdom
Preceded by Fulke Greville-Nugent; Myles O'Reilly	Member of Parliament for County Longford; 1869–1870; With: Myles O'Reilly	Succeeded by Myles O'Reilly; George Greville-Nugent
