= Baxter Langley =

British political activist and newspaper editor

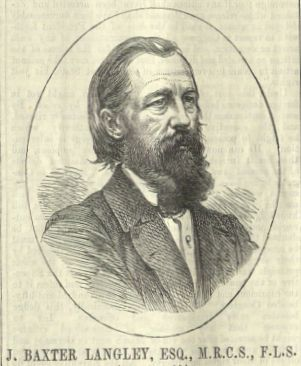
John Baxter Langley

John Baxter Langley (1819 – February 1892) was a radical political activist and newspaper editor.

== Early life ==
Langley son of Rev John Langley was born in Shrewsbury. His father was curate of the church of St Chad. The Langley's neighbours were the Darwins (parents of Charles Darwin). John Langley Snr moved to Wallingford in Oxfordshire (then Berkshire) where he became rector of St Mary's Church.

John Baxter Langley was educated at Sherborne, and studied at King's College London and the Leeds School of Medicine. He qualified as a surgeon, and began practising in Blackburn. There, he founded a Mechanics' Institute for the education of workers. This experience led him to pursue a literary career; he quit medicine in 1846, to become the full-time secretary of the Manchester Athenaeum. Langley's choice of speakers, including the Unitarian George Dawson (1821-1826), and women's activist Clara Lucas Balfour (1808-1878), led to friction with the Institute's directors, and ultimately to his dismissal. [David M. George, The Radical Campaigns of John Baxter Langley', University of Exeter Press, 2021, p.26.]

== Political activity ==
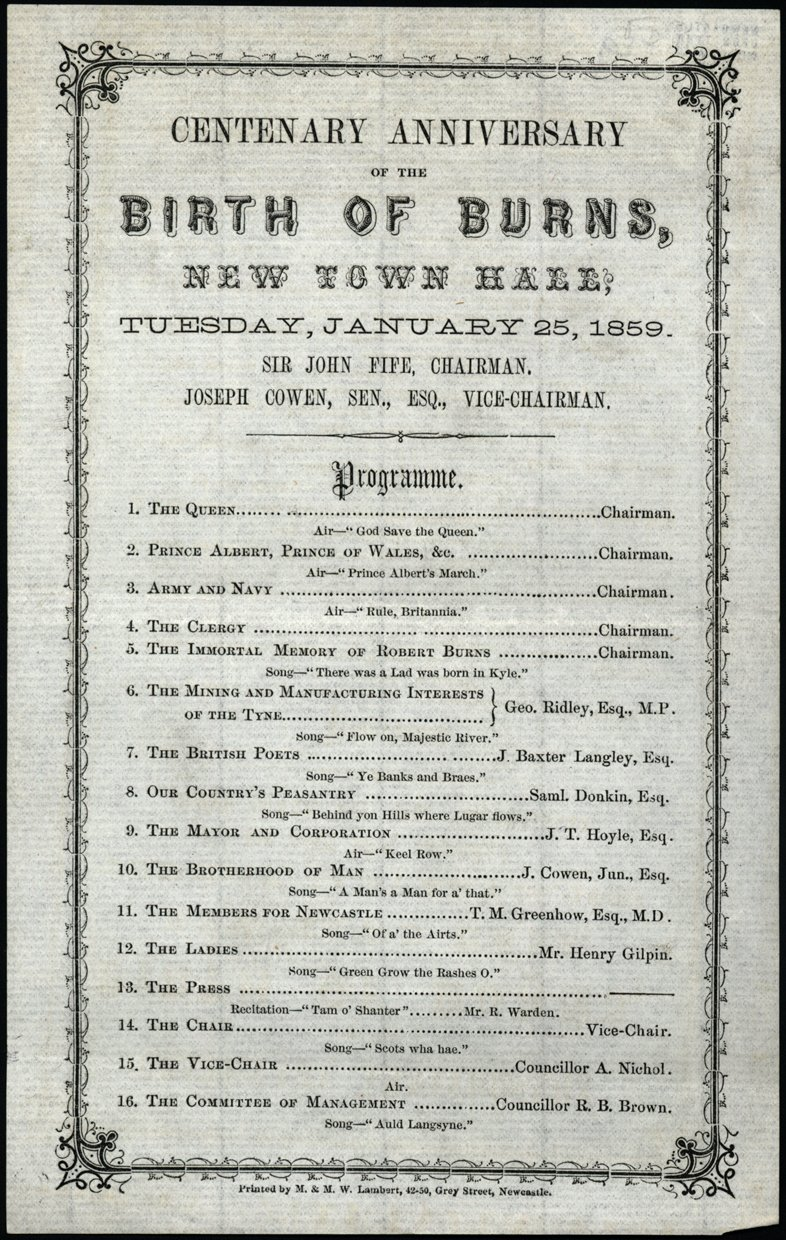
Programme for an 1859 'Birth of Burns' event, held at Newcastle-upon-Tyne, England, in which Langley is listed as proposing a toast to "The British Poets" (transcription)

Langley put himself forward as an ultra-radical candidate for Stockport at the 1852 United Kingdom general election although, like most ultra-radical and Chartist activists, he withdrew his name before the poll was taken. He also became involved in the Peace Society, supported the Polish people during the January Uprising, and joined with radicals such as Edmond Beales and trade unionists such as George Odger to form the Garibaldi Working Men's Committee.

Langley also worked as a journalist. He was manager of the radical Morning Star newspaper from its establishment, and acted as its editor for much of 1858. He then became editor of the Newcastle Chronicle and, while there, raised considerable funds for victims of mining disasters, mostly notably an 1860 explosion at the Burradon Colliery. He is commemorated in the village with a housing development named after him.

At the 1865 United Kingdom general election, Langley put himself forward in Greenwich and, on this occasion, a poll was taken. He took fourth place in the two-seat constituency, with only 178 votes. Thereafter, he devoted much time to the Reform League, presiding over a large demonstration in Hyde Park in 1866. The following year, he led the march to a further demonstration in the park, and was the lead speaker on its second platform.

Langley planned to stand in Greenwich again at the 1868 United Kingdom general election, but ultimately withdrew, to ease the path of William Gladstone, the Liberal Chancellor of the Exchequer. He put himself forward at the 1870 Colchester by-election, having been persuaded by Josephine Butler to stand in opposition to the Contagious Diseases Acts and Sir Henry Storks, the Liberal candidate, who was a leading supporter of it. He withdrew at the last moment, and Storks' defeat by the Conservative candidate was widely attributed to Butler and Langley's intervention.

Langley stood in Greenwich for the first London School Board, in 1870, and stood for Parliament in the 1873 Greenwich by-election. Opposing an official Liberal candidate, he took a much higher vote than predicted, leading to an unexpected Conservative Party victory. He next stood in the seat at the 1874 United Kingdom general election, this time co-operating unofficially with Gladstone, the two opposing two Conservatives. Despite this arrangement, Langley was once more defeated, polling behind both Gladstone and one of the Conservative candidates.

== Downfall ==
Langley was involved in the formation of the Amalgamated Society of Railway Servants in 1871, and served as its first president. He also became chair of the board of the Artisans, Labourers and General Dwellings Company, and in this role, he worked with William Swindlehurst and Edward Saffery to buy estates cheaply, then sell them onto the company for a profit, a practice which Langley believed to be widespread and legal, if unethical. This was discovered in 1877, and the case was taken to trial; all were found guilty of conspiracy to defraud, and Langley was sentenced to eighteen months hard labour. He was released early, in December 1878, due to ill health.

Media offices
Preceded by John Hamilton and Henry Richard	Editor of the Morning Star; 1858	Succeeded by Samuel Lucas
Trade union offices
Preceded by New position	President of the Amalgamated Society of Railway Servants; 1872–1874	Succeeded by John David Jenkins
