= Samuel Blackall =

Irish soldier and politician

Colonel Samuel Blackall
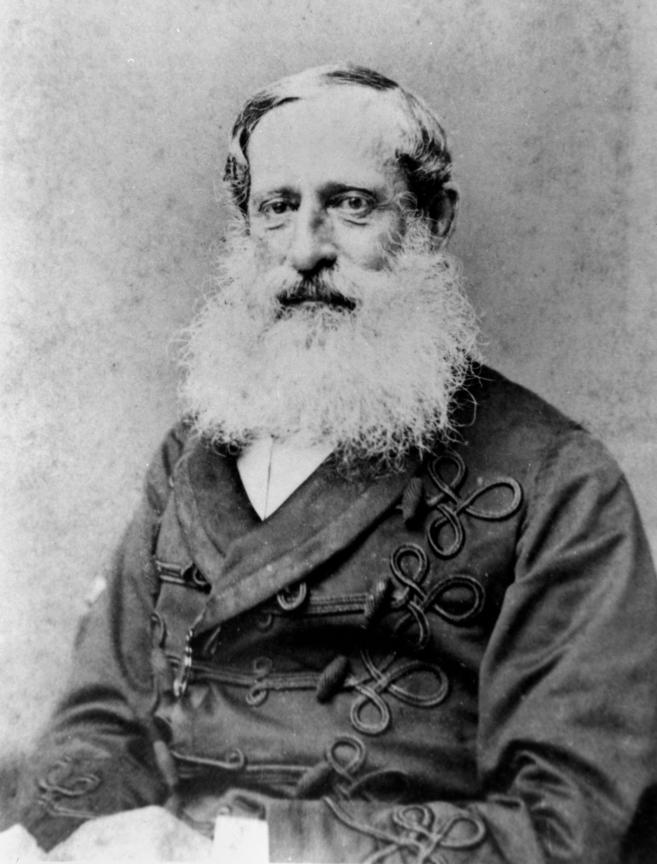

2nd Governor of Queensland
- In office 14 August 1868 – 2 January 1871
- Monarch: Queen Victoria
- Preceded by: Sir George Bowen
- Succeeded by: George Phipps, 2nd Marquess of Normanby

Personal details
- Born: 1 May 1809 Dublin, Ireland, United Kingdom of Great Britain and Ireland
- Died: 2 January 1871 (aged 61) Brisbane, Queensland
- Resting place: Toowong Cemetery, Queensland
- Spouse(s): Georgiana Rowles (1833–1853); Catherine Bond (1858–1864)
- Profession: Politician

Samuel Wensley Blackall (1 May 1809 – 2 January 1871) was an Irish soldier and politician, who was the second Governor of Queensland from 1868 until he died in office in 1871.

== Early life ==
Blackall was born in Dublin, Ireland into a prosperous Irish family and attended Trinity College Dublin at the age of 15, but did not graduate. In 1827 he joined the 85th (Bucks Volunteers) Regiment of Foot, as an ensign and was appointed a lieutenant in 1832. He sold his commission in 1833 after five years service and joined the Royal Longford Militia, as a major.

== Public life ==
Blackall entered Irish public life in 1833, becoming High Sheriff of Longford for 1833 and, several years later, high sheriff of County Tyrone for 1862. In between those appointments, he spent four years as an MP in the British House of Commons for the constituency of County Longford.

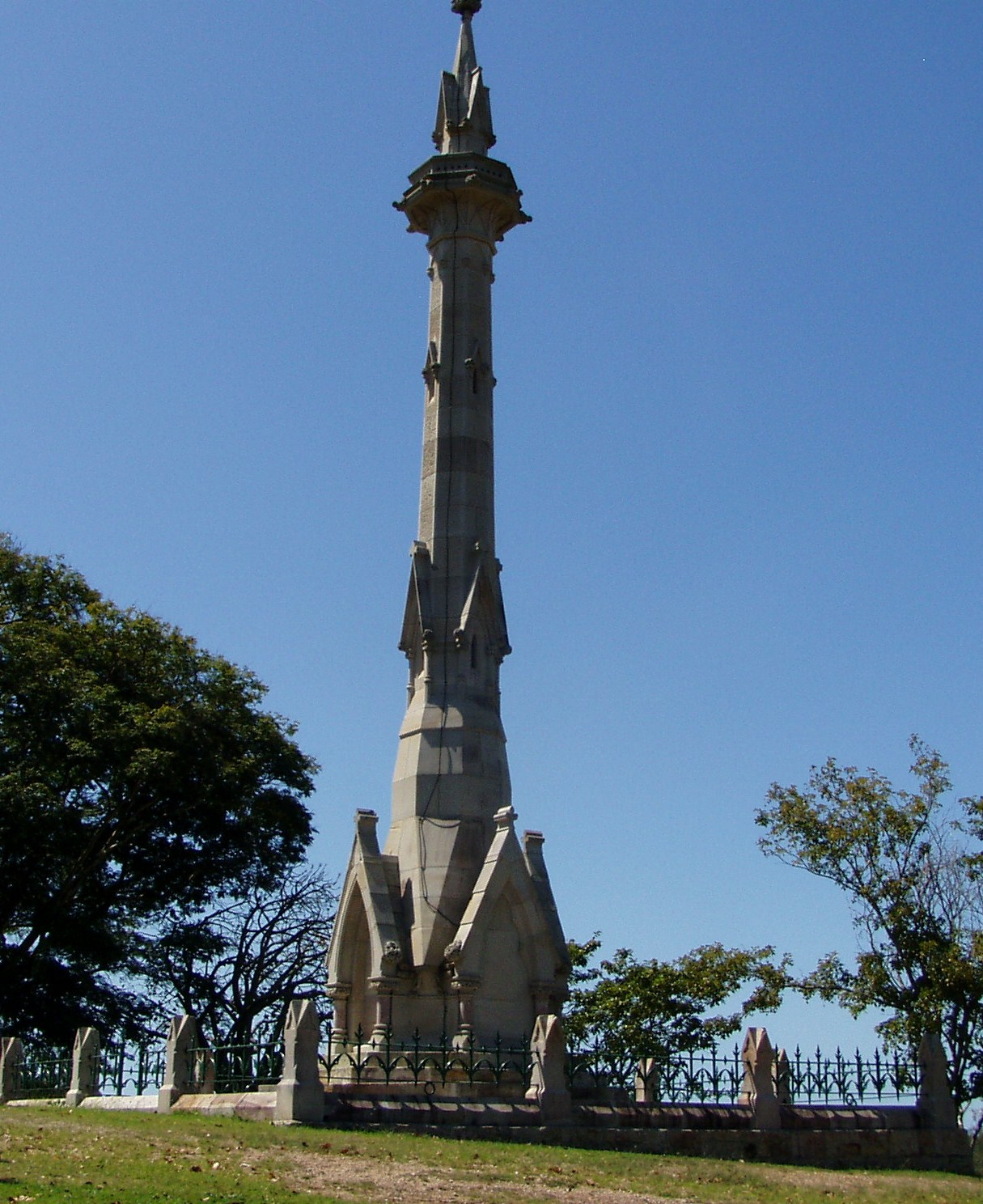
Monument at the burial site of Samuel Blackall at Brisbane's Toowong Cemetery

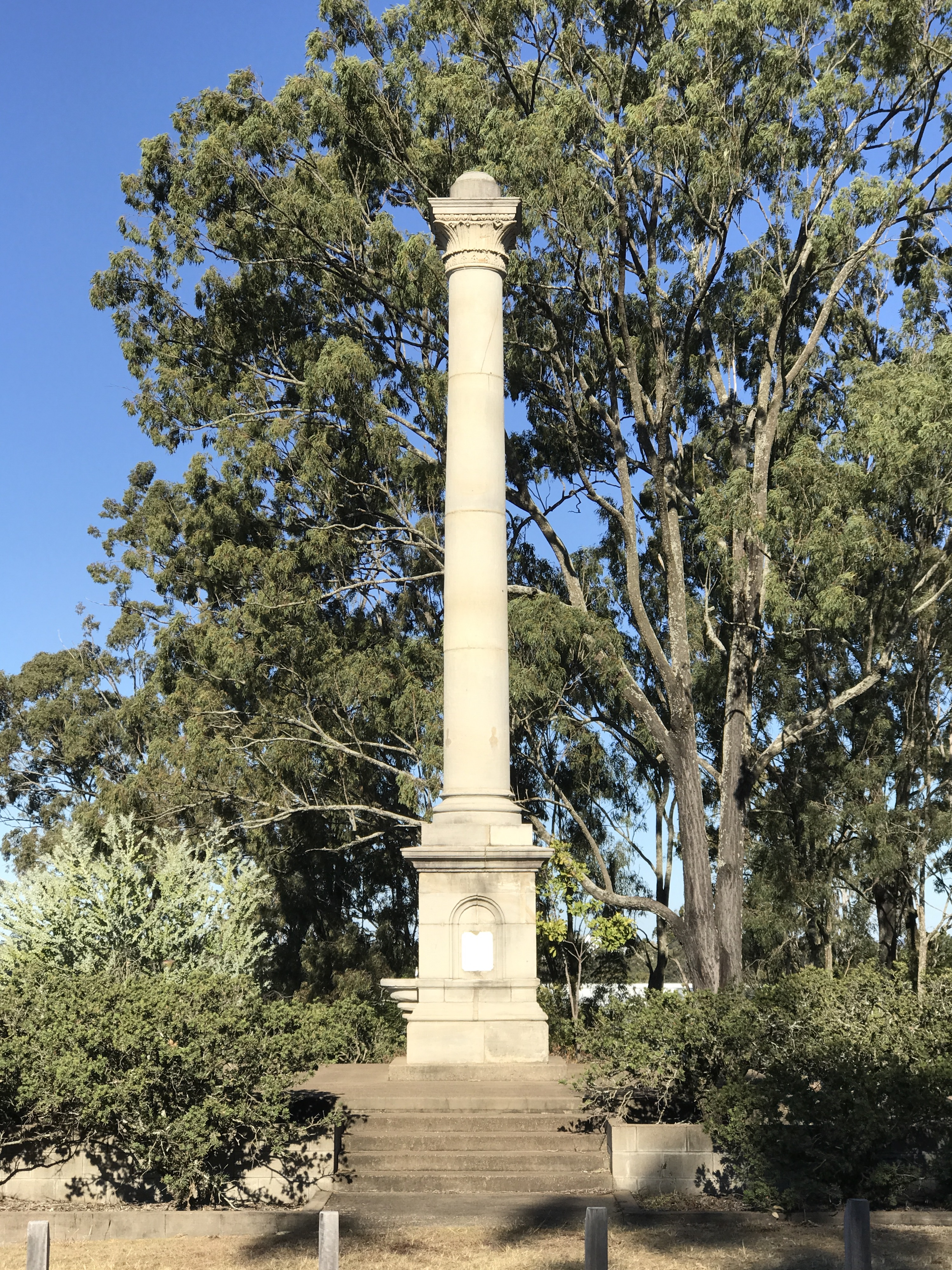
Blackall Memorial Fountain, Ipswich

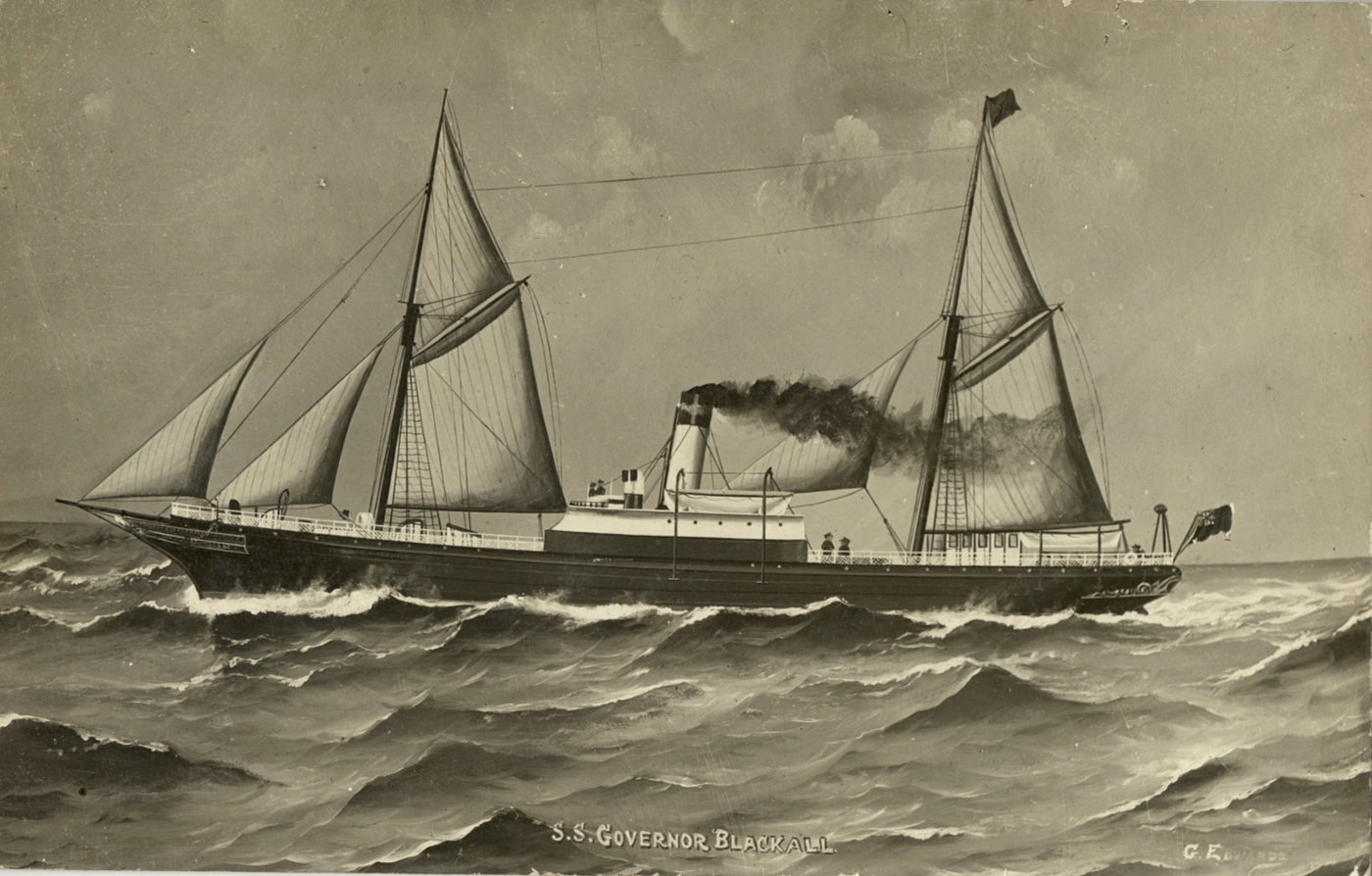
SS Governor Blackall (merchant ship)

From 1851 to 1857, he worked in the colonial service as Lieutenant-Governor of Dominica. After some trouble with the Colonial Office, he returned to colonial service as governor of Sierra Leone, then governor in chief at the West African Settlements from 1865, and then Governor of Queensland from 1868. Blackall's tenure as governor was dominated by a constitutional crisis caused by a deadlock in the Legislative Assembly of Queensland.

== Death and legacy ==
By 1870, Blackall's health was declining rapidly, and shortly after selecting the highest burial site at the new Toowong Cemetery, he died in office on 2 January 1871.

The town of Blackall in Queensland was named after him, as was the Blackall Range and Blackall Terrace in East Brisbane and the merchant ship SS Governor Blackall.

Parliament of the United Kingdom
Preceded by Henry White, 1st Baron Annaly; Anthony Lefroy	Member of Parliament for County Longford; 1847 – 1851; With: Richard Maxwell Fox	Succeeded by Richard More O'Ferrall
Government offices
Preceded by Sir George Bowen	Governor of Queensland; 1868 – 1871	Succeeded by George Phipps, 2nd Marquess of Normanby
