= Henry George Hughes =

Irish judge and politician

Henry George Hughes (10 August 1810 – 22 July 1872) was an Irish judge, politician, and third Baron of the Court of Exchequer. In 1850 he was appointed Solicitor-General for Ireland. He was elected Member of Parliament (MP) for County Longford in 1856.

== Background and early career ==
He was born in Dublin, eldest son of James Hughes, solicitor, and Margaret Morton, daughter of Trevor Stannus Morton, also a solicitor. They lived on Capel Street. He went to a private school at Jervis Street, Dublin and matriculated at Trinity College Dublin in 1825, but did not proceed to a degree. He entered the King's Inns in 1830, and Gray's Inn in 1832. He was called to the Irish Bar in 1834, Queen's Counsel in 1844.

He practised at the Chancery Bar and rapidly built up a very large practice; he became renowned for his mastery of Chancery procedure, which was then very complex. His book Chancery Practice (1837) enjoyed considerable success. He was equally successful at the Inner Bar.

== Political and legal career ==
Before entering parliament for County Longford he had stood unsuccessfully for County Cavan in 1855. He was a Catholic and could generally rely politically on the support of the Catholic hierarchy, although his support for the Ecclesiastical Titles Act, forbidding Roman Catholic bishops from naming episcopal sees after British cities or towns, offended some of his co-religionists.

His appointment to the Bench was well-deserved on merit, but is said to have been partly the result of the Government's policy of increasing the number of Catholic judges. The appointment of such a noted Chancery lawyer to a common law court caused some surprise, but in time he came to be recognised as one of the few lawyers who had successfully made the transition from one system of law to another.

== Family ==
He married Sarah Isabella l'Estrange, daughter of Major Francis l'Estrange. They had two daughters, of whom Anna, the elder, married the future Lord Chief Justice of Ireland, Michael Morris, 1st Baron Killanin. His younger daughter Margaret married Edward Fitzgerald of Dublin. His wife conformed to the Church of Ireland, and their daughters were raised in that faith, though both married Catholics. He lived in Monkstown, Dublin, and also owned property in County Longford. He died at Bray, County Wicklow in 1872, attended in his last illness by his brother James, a well-known physician.

== Arms ==
Coat of arms of Henry George Hughes

Crest
Out of a ducal coronet a demi-lion rampant Sable.
Escutcheon
Argent a lion rampant Sable armed and langued Gules.
Motto
Non Vis Sed Veritas

Parliament of the United Kingdom
Preceded by Fulke Greville-Nugent; Richard Maxwell Fox	Member of Parliament for County Longford; 1856–1857; With: Fulke Greville-Nugent	Succeeded by Fulke Greville-Nugent; Henry White
Legal offices
Preceded by John Hatchell	Solicitor-General for Ireland; 1850–1852	Succeeded by James Whiteside
Preceded by Jonathan Christian	Solicitor-General for Ireland; 1858	Succeeded by Edmund Hayes
