= Fulke Greville-Nugent, 1st Baron Greville =

Irish Liberal politician

The Right Honourable The Lord Greville

Lord Lieutenant of Westmeath
- In office 1871–1883
- Preceded by: The Marquess of Westmeath
- Succeeded by: Sir Benjamin Chapman, Bt

Member of Parliament for County Longford
- In office 1852–1869 Serving with Richard Maxwell Fox (1852–1856), Henry George Hughes (1856–1857), Henry White (1857–1861), Luke White (1861–1862), Myles O'Reilly (1862–1869)
- Preceded by: Richard Maxwell Fox; Richard More O'Ferrall
- Succeeded by: Myles O'Reilly; Reginald Greville-Nugent

High Sheriff of Hertfordshire
- In office 1850–1850
- Preceded by: Abel Smith
- Succeeded by: William John Lysley

Personal details
- Born: 17 February 1821
- Died: 25 January 1883 (aged 61)
- Party: Liberal
- Spouse: Lady Rosa Emily Mary Anne Nugent (after 1840)
- Children: Algernon Greville-Nugent, 2nd Baron Greville; George Greville-Nugent; Robert Greville-Nugent; Reginald Greville-Nugent; Patrick Greville-Nugent; Mildred Greville-Nugent
- Parent(s): Algernon Greville; Caroline Graham

Colonel Fulke Southwell Greville-Nugent, 1st Baron Greville (17 February 1821 – 25 January 1883), known as Fulke Greville until 1866, was an Irish Liberal politician.

== Early life ==
Greville was the second son of Algernon Greville, Esq., of North Lodge in Hertford, and the former Caroline Graham. His mother was the second daughter of Sir Bellingham Graham, 6th Baronet.

He was a member of a junior branch of the Greville family headed by the Earl of Warwick.

He served as an officer in the 1st Life Guards, and in 1850 was appointed Colonel of the disembodied Westmeath Militia. He became the regiment's Honorary Colonel in 1875.

== Political career ==
Greville sat as Member of Parliament for County Longford as a Liberal from 19 July 1852 until 1869, when he was raised to the Peerage of the United Kingdom as Baron Greville, of Clonyn in the County of Westmeath. He had adopted the surname of Nugent-Greville by Royal Patent in 1866. He subsequently served as Lord Lieutenant of Westmeath from 1871 to 1883.

He had the unintentional distinction in 1859 of being the last member of parliament to be arrested for non-attendance by the Serjeant at Arms; he was released after apologising immediately.

== Personal life ==
On 28 April 1840 Lord Greville married Lady Rosa Emily Mary Anne Nugent, the only daughter and heir of George Nugent, 1st Marquess of Westmeath and, his first wife, Lady Emily Cecil (second daughter of James Cecil, 1st Marquess of Salisbury). Together, they had six children:

- Algernon Greville-Nugent, 2nd Baron Greville (1841–1909).
- Hon. George Frederick Greville-Nugent (1842–1897).
- Hon. Robert Southwell Greville-Nugent (1847–1912).
- Hon. Reginald James Macartney Greville-Nugent (1848–1878).
- Hon. Patrick Emilius John Greville-Nugent (1852–1925), who married Ermengarda Ogilvy on 5 June 1882.
- Hon. Mildred Charlotte Greville-Nugent (d. 1906), who married Alexius Huchet, Marquis de La Bêdoyére on 26 August 1869.

Lord Greville died on 25 January 1883.

Parliament of the United Kingdom
Preceded by Richard Maxwell Fox; Richard More O'Ferrall	Member of Parliament for County Longford; 1852–1869; With: Richard Maxwell Fox 1852–1856; Henry George Hughes 1856–1857; Henry White 1857–1861; Luke White 1861–1862; Myles O'Reilly 1862–1869	Succeeded by Myles O'Reilly; Reginald Greville-Nugent
Honorary titles
Preceded by Abel Smith	High Sheriff of Hertfordshire; 1850	Succeeded by William John Lysley
Preceded by The Marquess of Westmeath	Lord Lieutenant of Westmeath; 1871–1883	Succeeded by Sir Benjamin Chapman, Bt
Peerage of the United Kingdom
New creation	Baron Greville; 1869–1883	Succeeded by Algernon Greville
