= Lawrence Harman King-Harman =

Lawrence Harman King-Harman (born 1816 as "Lawrence Harman King") was the younger son of Robert King, 1st Viscount Lorton (heir to the estate of Rockingham, County Roscommon) and Lady Frances Harman (heir to the estate of Newcastle, Ballymahon, County Longford). While his elder brother, Robert King, would inherit the viscountcy and Rockingham in 1854, Lawrence inherited Newcastle - the largest landed estate in County Longford - from his maternal grandmother in 1838, aged just 22. He adopted the surname King-Harman at this time in recognition of his maternal ancestry. As a resident landlord, King-Harman enjoyed better relations with his tenantry than had his absentee grandmother. King-Harman was married to Mary Cecilia Johnstone of Stirling. He twice ran for election in the constituency of County Longford as a Conservative, but was unsuccessful on both occasions.

Upon his death in 1875 he was succeeded by his sons Colonel Edward Robert King-Harman, Colonel Wentworth Henry King-Harman and Sir Charles King-Harman. He was commemorated by the King-Harman Memorial Clock Tower in the village of Keenagh in 1878.
