= Richard Maxwell Fox =

Irish politician (1816–1856)

Member of Parliament for County Longford
- In office 13 August 1847 – 26 April 1856 Serving with Fulke Greville-Nugent (1852–1856); Richard More O'Ferrall (1851–1852); Samuel Blackall (1847–1852)
- Preceded by: Anthony Lefroy; Henry White
- Succeeded by: Fulke Greville-Nugent; Henry George Hughes

Personal details
- Born: 1816 Raheny, Dublin, Ireland
- Died: 26 April 1856 (aged 39–40) St Leonards-on-Sea, Hastings, Sussex, England
- Party: Independent Irish
- Other political affiliations: Repeal Association
- Spouse: Susan Amelia Halsted (m. 1835)
- Parent(s): Francis Fox; Frances Browne

Richard Maxwell Fox (1816 – 26 April 1856) was an Irish Independent Irish Party and Repeal Association politician.

Born in Raheny, Dublin, Fox was the son of Francis Fox and Frances, daughter of Jemmett Browne and Frances née Blennerhassett. In 1835, he married Susan Amelia Halsted, daughter of William Halsted and Emma Mary née Pellew, and they had six children: Emma Louisa; Frances Amelia; Annie Elizabeth (died 1878); Susan Henrietta (died 1883); Francis William (1836–1855); and Richard Edward (1846–1885).

He also had two children with actress Frances Medex - Walter Charles Fox Medex and Marianne Rose Fox.

Fox became a Repeal Association MP for County Longford at the 1847 general election and, becoming an Independent Irish MP in 1852, held the seat until his death in 1856.

Fox died on 26 April 1856 at St Leonards-on-Sea.

Parliament of the United Kingdom
Preceded by Anthony Lefroy; Henry White	Member of Parliament for County Longford; 1847–1856; With: Fulke Greville-Nugent (1852–1856); Richard More O'Ferrall (1851–1852); Samuel Blackall (1847–1852)	Succeeded by Fulke Greville-Nugent; Henry George Hughes
