= William O'Reilly (educator) =

Irish educator

William Joseph O'Reilly
- Born: 1864
- Died: 1937 (aged 72–73)
- Occupation: Commissioner of Education
- Parents: Myles O'Reilly (father); Ida Jerningham (mother)

William Joseph O'Reilly (1864–1937) was an Irish educator.

He was the eldest son and heir of Myles O'Reilly of Knock Abbey Castle (previously known as Thomastown Castle), County Louth and was educated at Ushaw College and London University. In 1907 he was appointed Commissioner of Education in Ireland.

His grandfather was also named William Joseph O'Reilly and served as MP for Dundalk from 1832 to 1835.
