= Morning Star (London newspaper) =

19th-century daily newspaper in London

The Morning Star was a radical pro-peace London daily newspaper started by Richard Cobden and John Bright in March 1856. It had substantial support from Joseph Sturge.

The newspaper was edited by Samuel Lucas from 1859 until his death in 1865. He had a financial stake in the paper, and as an "active managing partner" he succeeded in recruiting the Irish politician, historian and novelist Justin McCarthy and novelist Edmund Yates as contributors. McCarthy succeeded Lucas as editor from 1865 until 1868. The final issue, with John Morley as editor, was on 13 October 1869.

The Scottish novelist William Black briefly worked as a journalist on the paper in 1863–64.

== Editors ==
1856: William Haly
1857: John Hamilton and Henry Richard
1858: Baxter Langley
1859: Samuel Lucas
1865: Justin McCarthy
1869: John Morley
