= Edmund Hayes (judge) =

Irish judge (1804–1897)

Edmund Hayes QC

Solicitor-General for Ireland
- In office 1858–1859
- Preceded by: Henry George Hughes
- Succeeded by: John George

Personal details
- Born: Edmund Bradshaw Hayes; 1804
- Died: April 29, 1867 Bray, County Wicklow
- Spouse: (1) Grace Shaw (2) Mary Harriet Tranchell
- Parent: William Hayes

Edmund Hayes QC (1804 – 29 April 1867), was an Irish judge. In 1858 he became Solicitor-General for Ireland.

== Life ==
Hayes was birn in 1804, the eldest son of William Hayes of Millmount, County Down. He was educated at the Belfast Academical Institution, and in 1820 entered Trinity College Dublin, where he proceeded B.A. in 1825, and LL.B. and LL.D. in 1832. In 1827, he was called to the Irish Bar and joined the north-eastern circuit, but subsequently transferred himself to the home circuit.

Hayes was appointed by the benchers of the King's Inns as lecturer in constitutional and criminal law. He was appointed a Q.C. in 1852, and was Law Adviser to the Lord Lieutenant of Ireland under Lord Derby's first administration, and again in 1858, and was subsequently promoted to be Irish Solicitor-General. In 1859, he succeeded Philip Cecil Crampton in the Court of Queen's Bench (Ireland), but was compelled in 1866 to absent himself owing to ill-health. He resigned in Michaelmas term of that year, and died at his house at Bray, County Wicklow, 29 April 1867.

== Works ==
Hayes wrote a treatise on Irish criminal law (Dublin, 1843, 2nd edition). In 1837, he published reports of cases in the Court of Exchequer (Ireland) 1830 to 1832, and in 1843, with Thomas Jones, a continuation from 1832 to 1834.

== Family ==
Hayes married, first, Grace Mary Anne, daughter of John Shaw of Donlagh, County Dublin, in 1835, by whom he had nine children; and secondly, Mary Harriett Tranchell, widow of Lieutenant James Shaw, by whom he had one son.

Legal offices
Preceded by Henry George Hughes	Solicitor-General for Ireland; 1858–1859	Succeeded by John George
