= 1887 North Longford by-election =

UK Parliamentary by-election

The 1887 North Longford by-election was a parliamentary by-election held for the United Kingdom House of Commons constituency of North Longford on 5 February 1887. The sitting member, Justin McCarthy of the Irish Parliamentary Party had been re-elected in the general election of 1886, but having been elected also in the constituency of Londonderry City, he chose to sit for the latter on the basis that the Longford seat was safe for a Nationalist candidate. In the ensuing by-election another Irish Parliamentary Party candidate, Tim Healy, former member for South Londonderry, was elected unopposed.
