= Anthony Lefroy (Irish politician) =

Irish politician

Anthony Lefroy (1800 – 12 January 1890) was an Irish Conservative Party MP in the United Kingdom Parliament.

He was born in Dublin, the eldest son of politician and jurist Thomas Langlois Lefroy, was educated at Trinity College and studied law at the King's Inns (1820) and Lincoln's Inn (1822).

He was MP for County Longford from 1830 to 1832, and again from 1833 to 1837 (he lost the seat at the 1832 general election and was returned after an election petition). He returned to the seat in 1842–1847, when he was declared elected after a petition challenging the result of the 1841 general election. He was appointed High Sheriff of Longford for 1849–50. He then represented his father's old seat, the University constituency of Dublin University, from 1858 to 1870. In 1870 he accepted the Chiltern Hundreds and left Parliament.

He died at Carrickglass in 1890. He had married the Hon. Jane King, daughter of Robert King, 1st Viscount Lorton. They had one son, who predeceased him, and two daughters. His estates passed to his brother, Thomas, who himself died the next year.

Parliament of the United Kingdom
Preceded by Sir George Fetherston, Bt; George Forbes, Viscount Forbes	Member of Parliament for County Longford; 1830 – 1832; With: George Forbes, Viscount Forbes	Succeeded by Luke White; James Halpin Rorke
Preceded by Luke White; James Halpin Rorke	Member of Parliament for County Longford; 1833 – 1837; With: George Forbes, Viscount Forbes 1833–1836; Luke White 1836–1837; Charles Fox 1837–1837	Succeeded by Luke White; Henry White
Preceded by Luke White; Henry White	Member of Parliament for County Longford; 1842 – 1847; With: Henry White	Succeeded by Samuel Blackall; Richard Fox
Preceded by Joseph Napier; George Hamilton	Member of Parliament for Dublin University; 1858 – 1870; With: George Hamilton 1858–1859; James Whiteside 1859–1866; John Edward Walsh 1866–1867; Robert Warren 1867–1868; John Thomas Ball 1868–1870	Succeeded by John Thomas Ball; David Plunket
