= Justin McCarthy (politician) =

Irish politician (1830–1912)

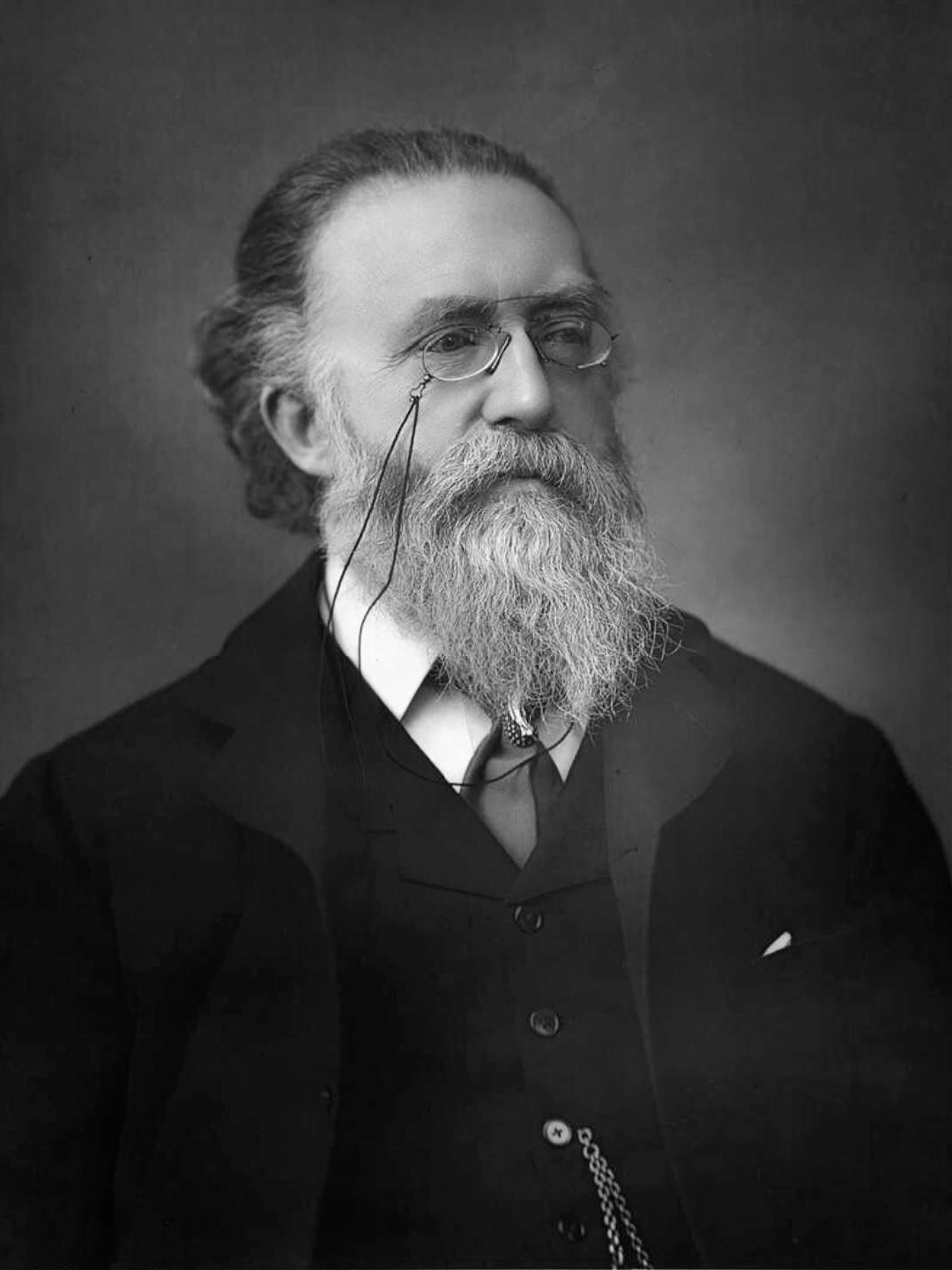
- McCarthy in 1891

Member of Parliament for County Longford
- In office 1879–1885 Serving with George Errington
- Preceded by: George Errington; Myles O'Reilly
- Succeeded by: Constituency divided

Member of Parliament for North Longford
- In office 1885–1887
- Preceded by: Constituency created
- Succeeded by: Tim Healy

Member of Parliament for Londonderry City
- In office 1886–1892
- Preceded by: Charles Lewis
- Succeeded by: John Ross

Leader of the Irish National Federation
- In office 1891–1892
- Succeeded by: John Dillon

Member of Parliament for North Longford
- In office 1892–1900
- Preceded by: Tim Healy
- Succeeded by: J. P. Farrell

Personal details
- Born: 22 November 1830 Cork, Ireland
- Died: 24 April 1912 (aged 81) Folkestone, Kent, England
- Party: Irish Parliamentary Party; Irish National Federation
- Spouse: Charlotte Ailman (m. 1855)
- Relatives: Justin Huntly McCarthy (son)

Justin McCarthy (Note: Often M‘Carthy in contemporary sources.) (22 November 1830 – 24 April 1912) was an Irish nationalist, journalist, historian, novelist and politician. He was a Member of Parliament (MP) from 1879 to 1900, taking his seat in the House of Commons of the United Kingdom of Great Britain and Ireland.

== Early life ==
McCarthy was born in Cork City, Cork, and was educated there. He began his career as a journalist, aged 18, in Cork. From 1853 to 1859 he was in Liverpool, on the staff of the Northern Daily Times. In March 1855, he married Charlotte Ailman. In 1860 he moved to London, as parliamentary reporter to the Morning Star, of which he became editor in 1864. He gave up his post in 1868, and, after a lecturing tour in the United States, joined the staff of the Daily News as leader-writer in 1870 (where he was employed for the next twenty-three years) and was also to write for several periodicals including The Fortnightly Review, The Contemporary Review and The Nineteenth Century. He became one of the most useful and respected upholders of the liberal politics of the time. He lectured again in America in 1886–87.

== Political career ==
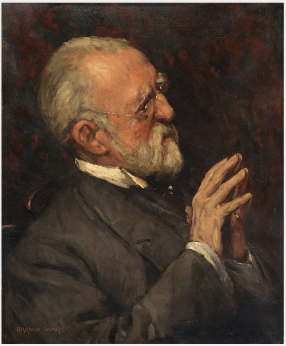
by Harold Waite

McCarthy was first elected to Parliament at a by-election on 4 April 1879, when he was returned unopposed as a Home Rule League MP for County Longford. He was re-elected unopposed as a Parnellite Home Ruler in 1880, and when the two-seat Longford constituency was split into two divisions under the Redistribution of Seats Act, he was elected as an Irish Parliamentary Party member for the new single-seat Northern division of Longford. His sole opponent, a Conservative, won only 6% of the votes.

At the 1886 general election, he was returned unopposed in North Longford, but had also stood in Londonderry City, where he was declared to have lost to the Unionist candidate by the narrow margin of 1778 votes to 1781. However, the result was later overturned on petition, and McCarthy opted to sit for Londonderry City. During the divorce controversy surrounding Charles Stewart Parnell in November 1890, the British Prime Minister Gladstone expressed a warning, given to Justin McCarthy as intermediary, that if Parnell retained leadership of the Irish Parliamentary Party it would mean the loss of the next election, the end of their alliance and Home Rule. When the annual party leadership election meeting was called later that month, this threat was somehow not conveyed to the members, who re-elected Parnell leader of the Party.

After a further historical meeting of the Irish Party MPs early December, Parnell refused to retire, and the Party divided. McCarthy became chairman of the Anti-Parnellite group, or the Irish National Federation and held that post until January 1896; but his nationalism was of a temperate and orderly kind, and though his personal distinction singled him out for the chairmanship during the party dissensions of this period, he was in no active sense the political leader.

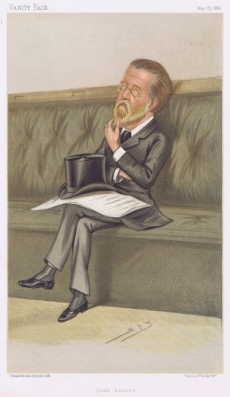
McCarthy caricatured by Spy in Vanity Fair, 1885

At the 1892 general election, McCarthy again stood both in North Longford and in Londonderry City. In each seat there was a two-way contest between McCarthy and a Unionist candidate, but the narrow Unionist victory in Londonderry City (by 1986 votes to 1960) was not overturned, and McCarthy sat for North Longford, where he had won over 93% of the votes. He was returned unopposed for North Longford in 1895, and stood down from Parliament at the 1900 general election.

== Writing ==
It has been claimed that McCarthy's true vocation was as a writer. He published his first novel, Paul Massie: A Romance in 1866, a prelude to several novels that attained a considerable readership: A Fair Saxon (1873), Dear Lady Disdain (1875), Miss Misanthrope (1878), and Donna Quixote (1879). McCarthy's best known work is his History of Our Own Times (vols. i-iv., 1879–1880; vol. v., 1897), which treats of the period between Queen Victoria's accession and her Diamond Jubilee, and ran into several revised editions.

In 1882 McCarthy published The Epoch of Reform, 1830-1850. England, he argued, had avoided continental revolution because in a Parliament otherwise incapable of anticipating "the wants and wishes of the country" her statesmen were shrewd enough to defer to "pressure from without". In the case of Ireland, however, he believed their judgement failed them. To "the manner in which the Government resisted Catholic Emancipation, and the grudging way of at last conceding it", he ascribed much of Ireland's subsequent "discontent and disaffection".

In 1885, he published England under Gladstone, 1880-1885 . He began a four-volume History of the Four Georges (1884–1901); later completed by his son, Justin Huntly McCarthy. McCarthy traced to the days of Robert Walpole and William Pulteney the origins of the contemporary English political parties which, appealing to prejudices and passions, seek to "manufacture" a public opinion of their own.

In 1893, McCarthy published The Dictator, a novel of politics and society about an exiled dictator of the fictional South American Republic of Gloria.

He also collaborated on three novels with Rosa Campbell Praed: The Right Honourable (1886), The Rebel Rose (issued anonymously in 1888 but appeared in their joint names in two later editions under the title, The Rival Princess), and The Ladies' Gallery (1888). They also collaborated on The Grey River, a book on the Thames, which was illustrated with etchings by Mortimer Menpes. He wrote The Story of Gladstone (1904), a somewhat uncritical biography of William Ewart Gladstone.

His biographer, Liam Harte, suggests that McCarthy's award of a civil-list pension for services to literature in 1903 "confirmed his stature as an eminent Victorian, while simultaneously reinforcing many Irish nationalists' jaundiced view of him as a careerist West Briton". Yet, reviewing his political career, Paul Townend finds that it was precisely McCarthy's "peculiar brand of anglophilia and deeply held Irish patriotism" that made him an ideal "ambassador between Parnellite nationalism and British opinion" which otherwise "despised" the cause of Irish Home Rule.

== Family life ==
McCarthy married Charlotte Ailman in 1855. They had a son Justin Huntly McCarthy born in 1859 who also became a Member of Parliament, and a daughter Charlotte, born in 1872. McCarthy died in Folkestone, Kent, England on 24 April 1912, aged 81.

Parliament of the United Kingdom
Preceded by George Errington and Myles O'Reilly	Member of Parliament for County Longford; 1879–1885; With: George Errington	Constituency divided
New constituency	Member of Parliament for North Longford; 1885–1887	Succeeded by Tim Healy
Preceded by Charles Lewis	Member of Parliament for Londonderry City; 1886–1892	Succeeded by John Ross
Preceded by Tim Healy	Member of Parliament for North Longford; 1892–1900	Succeeded by J. P. Farrell
Media offices
Preceded by Samuel Lucas	Editor of the Morning Star; 1865–1869	Succeeded by John Morley
