= Henry White, 1st Baron Annaly =

Irish British Army soldier and politician

Henry White, 1st Baron Annaly (1791 – 3 September 1873), was an Irish British Army soldier and politician.

== Biography ==
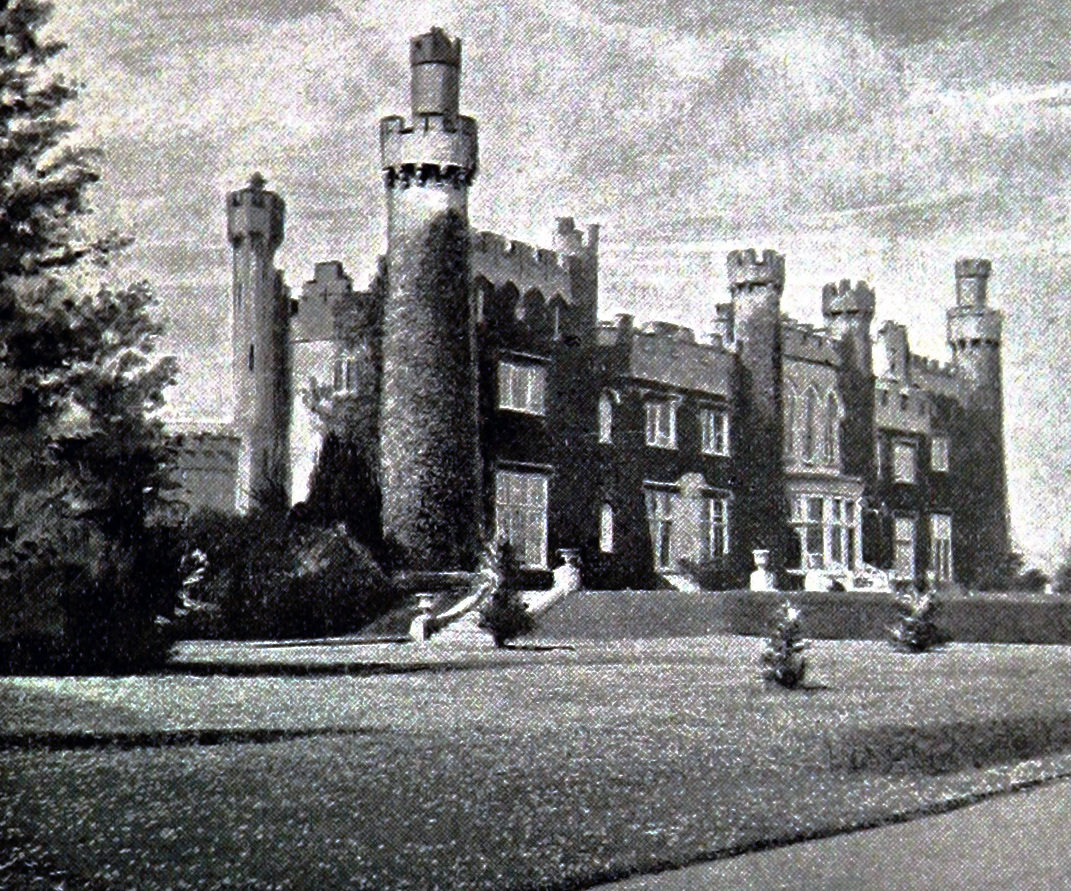
Luttrellstown Castle - the family seat

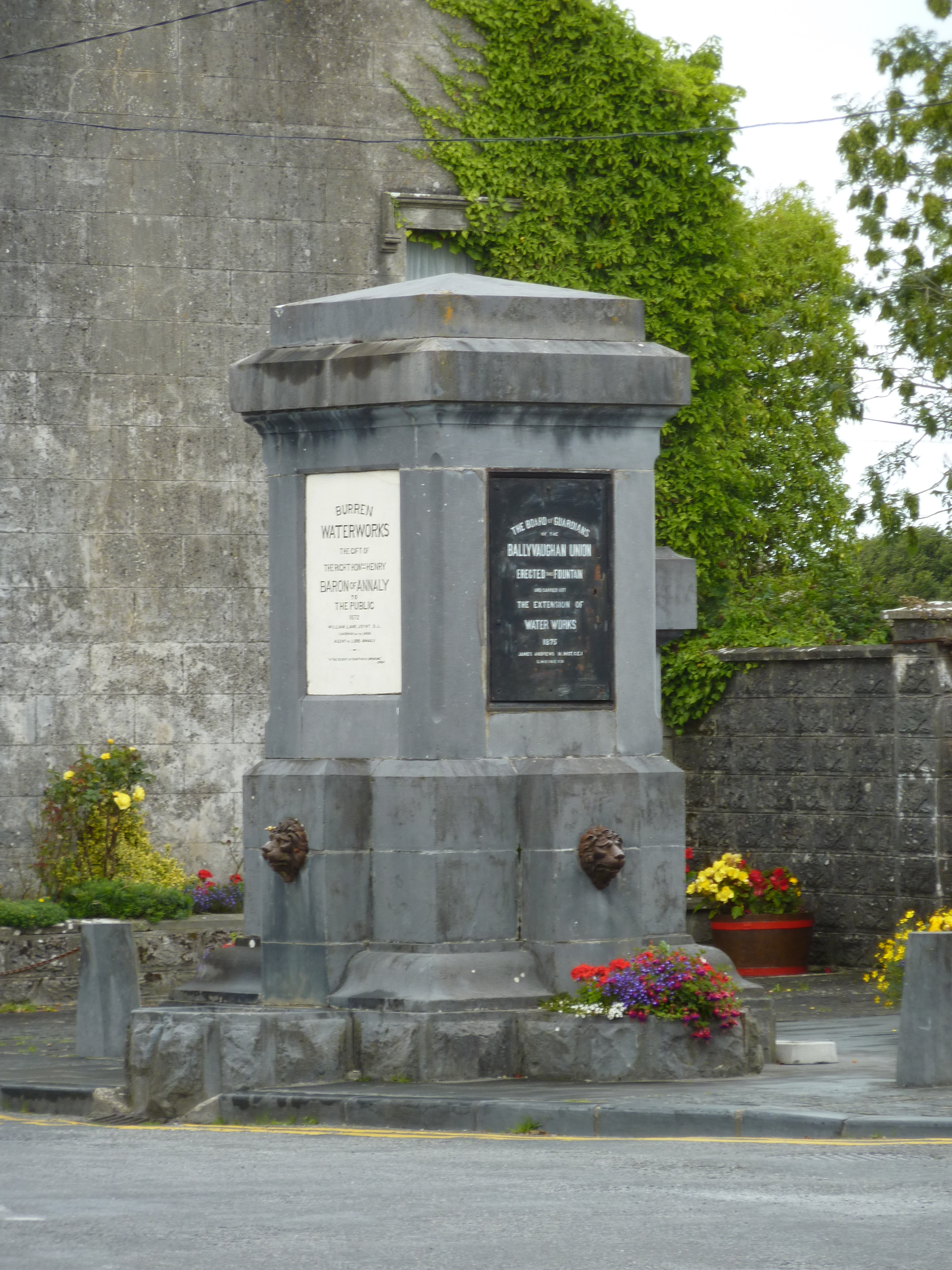
Burren Waterworks marker, Ballyvaughan, Co. Clare, acknowledging gift of the waterworks by Henry, Baron Annaly in 1872

Annaly was the son of Luke White, who had made a large fortune as a bookseller and lottery operator in Dublin and purchased the Luttrellstown estate. His mother was Elizabeth, daughter of Peter de la Mazière.

He purchased a Cornetcy in the 14th Light Dragoons in 1811 and served in the Peninsular War, fighting at the Siege of Badajoz and at the Battle of Salamanca. He purchased a Lieutenancy in 1812. In 1823 he was elected to the House of Commons for County Dublin, a seat he held until 1832, and also represented County Longford from 1837 to 1847 and again from 1857 to 1861. In 1837 he was appointed Colonel of the disembodied Royal Longford Militia, which he reformed when the Militia was revived after 1852. Between 1841 and 1873 Annaly served as Lord Lieutenant of County Longford. In 1863 he was raised to the peerage as Baron Annaly, of Annaly and Rathcline in the County of Longford.

Lord Annaly married Ellen (d. 12 May 1868), daughter of William Soper Dempster, on 3 October 1828. They had eight children:

- Luke White, 2nd Baron Annaly
- Capt. Henry White (4 September 1830 – 1860)
- Eleanor Eliza White (d. 29 April 1907), married on 10 June 1854 Lt-Col. Henry Holden and had issue
- George Frederick White (1 October 1831 – 1846)
- Francis Samuel White (17 March 1836 – April 1855)
- Charles William White (1838–1890)
- Emily Beaujolais White (4 January 1844 – 18 December 1923), married on 20 July 1867 Robert Grosvenor, 2nd Baron Ebury, and had issue
- Robert White (8 December 1844 – 3 March 1866)

Lord Annaly survived his wife by five years and died on 3 September 1873 at (demolished) Sunbury Park House, Sunbury on Thames. He was succeeded in the barony by his eldest son Luke.

== Bibliography ==
- Kidd, Charles, Williamson, David (editors). Debrett's Peerage and Baronetage (1990 edition). New York: St Martin's Press, 1990,
- Leigh Rayment's Peerage Pages
- Leigh Rayment's Historical List of MPs

Parliament of the United Kingdom
Preceded by Hans Hamilton; Richard Talbot	Member of Parliament for County Dublin; 1823–1832; With: Richard Talbot 1823–1830; Lord Brabazon 1830–1832	Succeeded by Christopher Fitzsimon; George Evans
Preceded by Luke White; Charles Fox	Member of Parliament for County Longford; 1837–1847; With: Luke White 1837–1842; Anthony Lefroy 1842–1847	Succeeded by Samuel Wensley Blackall; Richard Maxwell Fox
Preceded by Fulke Southwell Greville-Nugent; Henry George Hughes	Member of Parliament for County Longford; 1857–1861; With: Fulke Southwell Greville-Nugent	Succeeded by Fulke Southwell Greville-Nugent; Luke White
Honorary titles
Preceded by Luke White	Lord Lieutenant of Longford; 1841–1873	Succeeded by The Lord Annaly
Peerage of the United Kingdom
New creation	Baron Annaly; 1863–1873	Succeeded by Luke White
