= Myles O'Reilly (politician) =

Irish soldier, politician and publicist

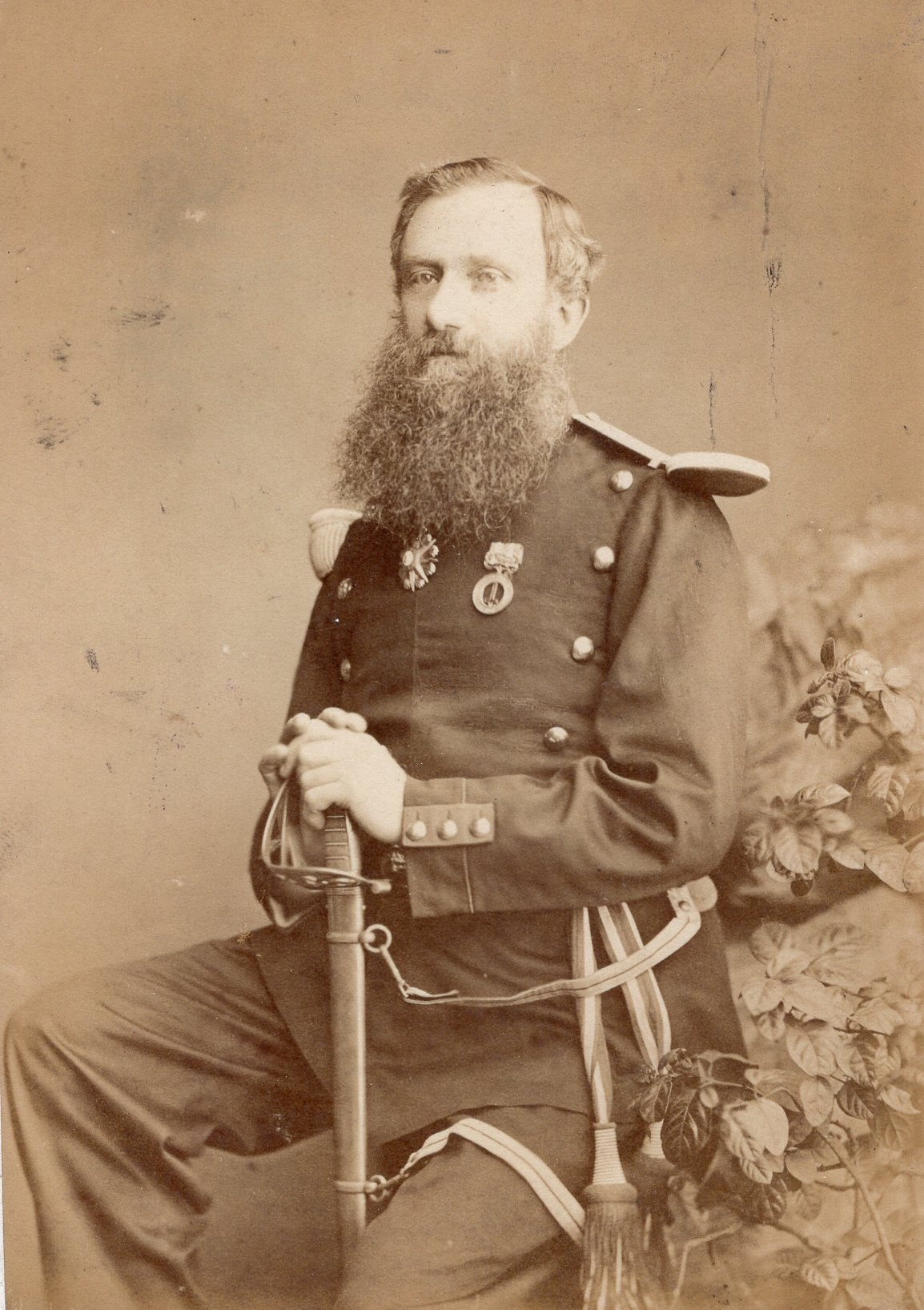
- Formal photograph of Myles William Patrick O'Reilly in ceremonial dress.

Member of Parliament for County Longford
- In office 1862–1879

High Sheriff of Louth
- In office 1848-1849

Personal details
- Born: 13 March 1825 Balbriggan, Ireland
- Died: 6 February 1880 (aged 54) Dublin, Ireland
- Spouse: Ida Jerningham (m. 1859)
- Children: 6, including William
- Parent: William O'Reilly (father)
- Education: Ushaw College; London University
- Military career
- Allegiance: United Kingdom; Pope Pius IX
- Rank: Captain
- Units: Louth Rifles; Battalion of St Patrick
- Conflicts: Second Italian War of Independence; Battle of Castelfidardo

Myles William Patrick O'Reilly (13 March 1825 in Balbriggan, Ireland – 6 February 1880 in Dublin, Ireland) was a Catholic soldier, MP and publicist.

He was the only son of William O'Reilly of Thomastown (Knock Abbey) Castle, County Louth. He was educated at Ushaw College in County Durham and at London University. He entered the Middle Temple in 1848. He succeeded his father to Knock Abbey Castle in 1844 and was selected High Sheriff of Louth for 1848–49.

== Career ==
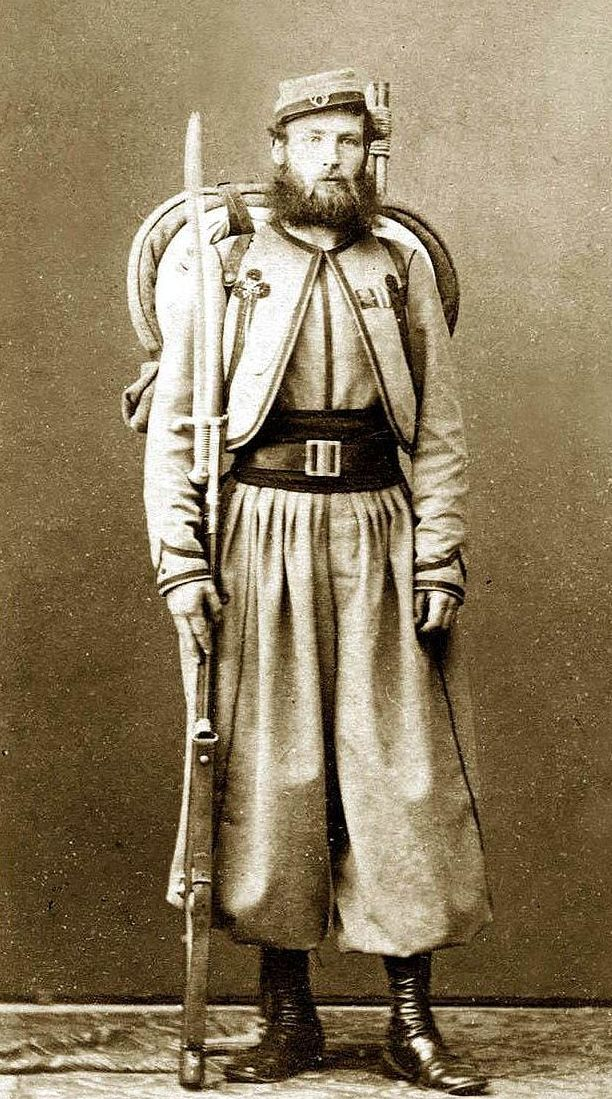
Pontifical Zouave of Major O'Reilly's Papal Battalion, carrying a .71 cal. Model 1842 French smoothbore musket.

He was commissioned a captain in the Louth Rifles in 1854, a British militia unit. When the Roman crisis arose he offered his services to Pope Pius IX against Giuseppe Garibaldi who had launched the Expedition of the Thousand. Raising and leading an Irish battalion of 900 men, known as The Battalion of St Patrick, he fought in the 18-day war until the surrender of Spoleto in September 1860. On the losing side at the Battle of Castelfidardo, the Papal States were soon reduced to the province of Lazio around Rome. Some of his men joined the Papal Zouaves after the war.

Subsequently, he was elected a Member of Parliament for County Longford from 1862 to 1879, when he was appointed the Assistant Commissioner of Intermediate Education, and was one of the founders of the Irish Home Rule League (1873–82). In addition to his historical Sufferings for the Faith in Ireland (1868), his pen was ever active in defence of the Holy See and Catholic interests.

== Personal life ==
On his death in 1880 he was buried in the family burial-ground at Philipstown, near Knock Abbey. He had married in 1859 Ida Jerningham and had 4 sons and 2 daughters. He was succeeded by his eldest son William Joseph O'Reilly.

== See also ==
- Second Italian War of Independence

== Notes ==
Parliament of the United Kingdom
Preceded by Luke White; Fulke Greville-Nugent	Member of Parliament for County Longford; 1862–1879; With: Fulke Greville-Nugent to 1869; Reginald Greville-Nugent 1869–70; George Greville-Nugent 1870–74; George Errington from 1874	Succeeded by Justin McCarthy; George Errington
