= Luke White (of Rathcline) =

Irish politician, died 1854

Luke White (jr.) (1785 – 1854) was an Irish politician.

White was the son of Irish bookseller, lottery operator and Member of Parliament for County Leitrim Luke White (sr.). Born before 1789, Luke White junior stood for election as MP for County Longford on a number of occasions, initially as a Whig and later as a supporter of Daniel O'Connell's Irish nationalist Repeal Association. After winning election in 1832, 1835 and 1841 his victories were overturned within months by committees of inquiry by the House of Commons and the seat handed over to his political opponents. He did, however, serve the full parliamentary term from 1837 to 1841. He did not contest any further elections and died in 1854.

Luke's brothers Samuel and Henry were also elected MPs, and Henry was ennobled as 'Baron Annaly of Annaly and Rathcline' in 1863.
