= George Forbes, Viscount Forbes =

British Member of Parliament (1785–1836)

George John Forbes, Viscount Forbes (3 May 1785 – 14 November 1836) was an Irish aristocrat who represented County Longford in the House of Commons from 1806 to 1832, and 1833 to his death in 1836.

== Early life ==
Forbes was the eldest son of George Forbes, 6th Earl of Granard, and Lady Selina Rawdon, the daughter of John Rawdon, 1st Earl of Moira.

== Military career ==
Forbes held a series of Army commissions, though he does not seem to have seen active service. He was notionally commissioned in the 108th Regiment of Foot, a regiment newly raised by his father, at the age of nine in 1794, then as a captain in the 74th Foot the following year. He was promoted to brevet major in 1805, a half-pay lieutenant colonel in 1812, a brevet colonel in 1815, and finally a major-general in 1825. He was also the colonel-commandant of the Royal Longford Militia from 1824 until his death in 1836.

== Political career ==
He entered politics in the 1806 general election, when he was elected unopposed for County Longford, in support of the Whig government. He remained a supporter of the Whigs in opposition. In 1811 he was appointed aide-de-camp to the prince-regent, but offered his resignation in 1812 in the belief that he could not hold the post while opposing the government. He was persuaded to retract but from this point voted with the government more frequently, though he remained a strong supporter of Catholic emancipation, and was recorded as a government supporter by the time of the 1818 general election. He continued to support the Liverpool government for some years, but distanced himself from them in 1822 after his request for his father to be made a marquess was declined.

During the 1820s, he continued actively to support Catholic relief, but distanced himself from figures such as Daniel O'Connell. In the 1830s, he voted against the English reform bills, and stood as an anti-reform Tory in the 1831 general election. The following year, he was a founder of the conservative Carlton Club, and in the 1832 general election was defeated in Longford for the first time in his career. After an election petition overturned the result he was reinstated in 1833, and re-elected in 1835.

== Personal life ==
In October 1832, Forbes married Frances Mary Territt. They had two sons: George-Arthur (born 1833) and his younger brother (born 1836).

== Illness and death ==
By late 1835, his health was failing. Forbes suffered a seizure and was held to be "of unsound mind" by a commission of lunacy. He died on 14 November 1836. The following year, his eldest son George succeeded to the family title as Earl of Granard.
