= Greville (surname) =

Greville is a surname, and may refer to:

- Algernon Greville (1798–1864), English soldier, cricketer and officer of arms
- Algernon Greville (MP) (c.1677–1720), English Member of Parliament
- Algernon Greville, 2nd Baron Greville (1841–1909), British politician
- Anthony Greville-Bell (1920–2008), Australian-born Special Air Service officer, scriptwriter and sculptor
- Charles Greville (1762–1832), English Member of Parliament and official
- Charles Greville (diarist) (1794–1865), English diarist and amateur cricketer
- Charles Greville (physician) (1695–1763), British physician
- Charles Francis Greville (1749–1809), British antiquarian, collector and politician
- Charles John Greville (1780–1836), British Army officer and politician
- Charles Greville, 3rd Baron Greville (1871–1952), British peer
- Charles Greville, 7th Earl of Warwick (1911–1984), British peer
- Daisy Greville, Countess of Warwick (1861–1938), British socialite and philanthropist
- David Greville, 8th Earl of Warwick (1934–1996), British peer and landowner
- Sir Edward Greville (died 1634), English nobleman and Member of Parliament
- Edward Greville (Australian politician) (1822–1903), member of the New South Wales Legislative Assembly
- Elizabeth Greville, Countess of Warwick (1720–1800), wife of Francis Greville, 1st Earl of Warwick
- Frances Greville (1724–1789), Irish poet and celebrity
- Francis Greville (MP for Warwick) (1667–1710), English politician and poet
- Francis Greville, 1st Earl of Warwick (1719–1773), British peer and landowner
- Francis Greville, 3rd Baron Brooke (1637–1658), English Parliamentarian supporter in the English Civil War
- Francis Greville, 5th Earl of Warwick (1853–1924), British politician
- Sir Fulke Greville (1536–1606), English gentleman and official
- Fulke Greville (1717–1806), English landowner and diplomat
- Fulke Greville, 1st Baron Brooke (1554–1628), English poet, dramatist and statesman
- Fulke Greville, 4th Baron Willoughby de Broke (c.1526–1606)
- George Greville (diplomat) (1851–1937), British diplomat
- George Greville (tennis) (1868–1958), English tennis player
- George Greville, 2nd Earl of Warwick (1746–1816), British peer and politician
- George Greville, 4th Earl of Warwick (1818–1893), English politician, bibliophile and collector
- Guy Greville, 9th Earl of Warwick (born 1957), British peer
- Handel Greville (1921–2014), Welsh rugby union footballer
- Harri Greville (born 1990), Welsh rugby league footballer
- Henrietta Greville (1861–1964), Australian labour organiser
- Henry Francis Greville (1760–1816), British impresario
- Henry William Greville (1801–1872), English nobleman and diarist
- Henry Greville, 3rd Earl of Warwick (1779–1853), British politician
- John Greville (died 1444), English Member of Parliament
- John Greville (died 1480) (1427–1480), son of John Greville (died 1444)
- John Greville (died 1547) (by 1492–1547), English Member of Parliament
- J. R. Greville (John Rodger Greville) (1834–1894), Irish-born comic actor in Australia
- Johnny Greville (born 1979/80), Irish hurling player and manager
- Julia Greville (born 1979), Australian swimmer
- Leopold Greville, 6th Earl of Warwick (1882–1928), British army officer
- Lady Louisa Greville (1743–1779), English noblewoman and engraver
- Dame Margaret Greville (1863–1942), British society host and philanthropist, wife of Ronald Greville
- Margaret Greville, 6th Baroness Willoughby de Broke (c.1561–1631), English peeress
- Paul Greville (born 1984/5), Irish Gaelic footballer and hurler
- Robbie Greville (born 1994), Irish hurler
- Robert Greville, 2nd Baron Brooke (1607–1643), English politician, military officer, peer and Puritan activist
- Robert Fulke Greville (1751–1824), British Army officer and politician
- Robert Fulke Greville (landowner) (1800–1867), English politician, soldier and landowner
- Robert Kaye Greville (1794–1866), Scottish botanist and illustrator
- Ronald Greville (1864–1908), English politician
- Sarah Greville, Countess of Warwick (1786–1851), wife of Henry Greville, 3rd Earl of Warwick
- Sidney Greville (1865–1927), British civil servant and courtier
- Thomas N. E. Greville (1910–1998), American statistician of psychic research
- Ursula Greville (1894–1991), British soprano, folksong singer and songwriter
- Violet, Lady Greville (1842–1932), British novelist and playwright
- William Greville (died 1401), English wool-merchant

== See also ==
- Greville-Nugent
- Grenville (surname)
- Gréville (surname)
