= Greville Arms Hotel =

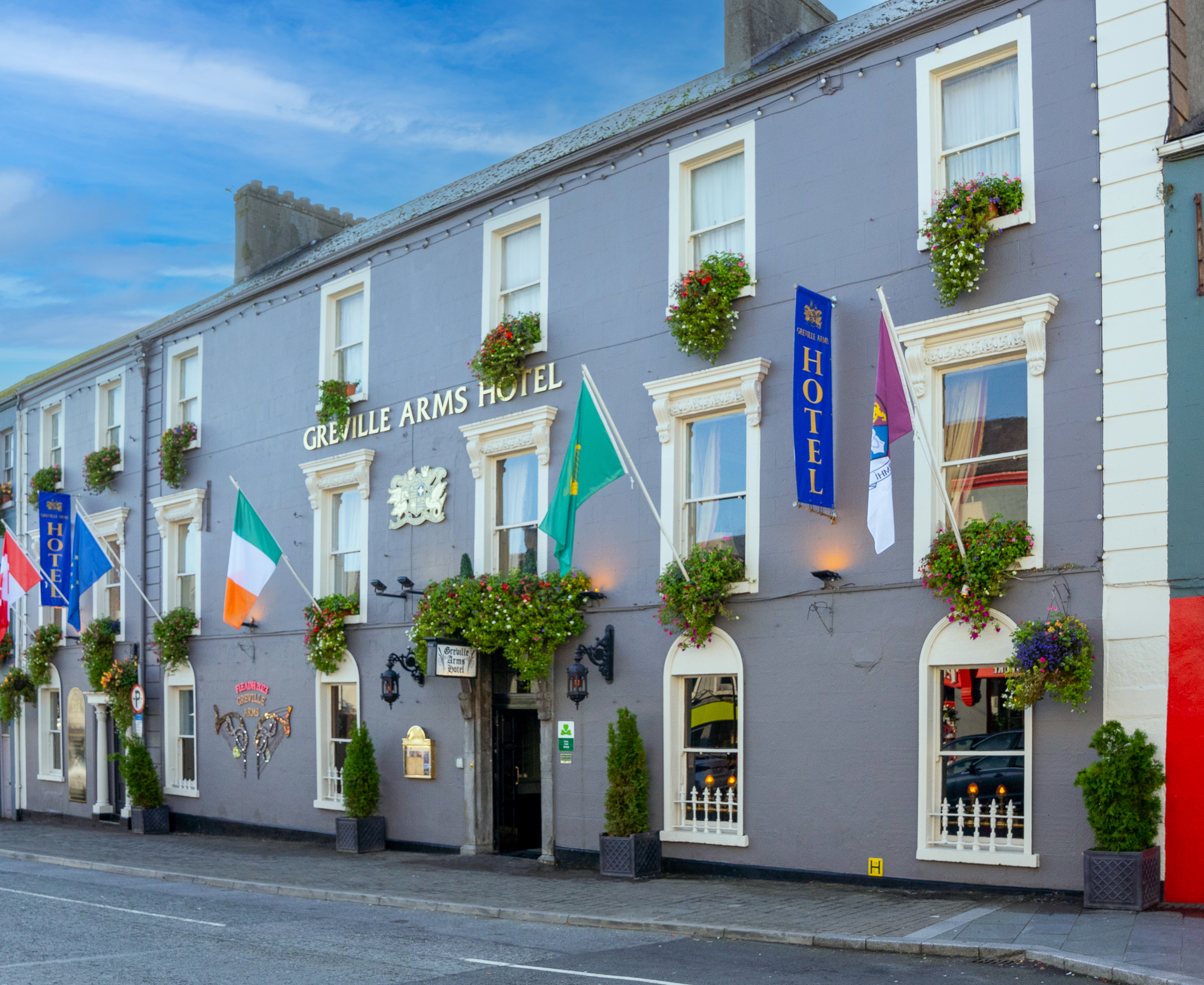
- The hotel in 2023
- Interactive map of the Greville Arms Hotel area
- Former names: Wilton's Hotel; Murray's Hotel

General information
- Classification: 3 stars
- Location: 33-37 Pearse Street, Mullingar, County Westmeath, Ireland
- Coordinates: 53°31′33″N 7°20′27″W
- Year built: 1750; 276 years ago
- Renovated: c. 1869
- Owner: Christopher Maye

Renovating team
- Architect: William Caldbeck

Website
- grevillearmshotel.ie

The Greville Arms Hotel is a hotel located in the centre of Mullingar, County Westmeath, Ireland which is best known for being one of the few surviving Irish hotels known to James Joyce and mentioned by him in his writings.

== History ==
=== Origins ===
The original building was constructed in c. 1750 and was known as Wilton's Hotel until 1826 when it was taken over by William Murray and subsequently became Murray's Hotel. The hotel was obtained by Fulke Greville-Nugent, 1st Baron Greville when he purchased the town of Mullingar in 1858 for £120,000 (equivalent to £12,338,611 in 2023). This was later renovated and the current building was constructed in c. 1869 by Greville's architect of choice, William Caldbeck. Caldbeck also designed the nearby Market House which was rebuilt in c. 1867 on the site of a previous Market House in existence by 1730.

Fulke Greville-Nugent died in 1883 and the Lord Greville title fell to his oldest son, Algernon Greville, 2nd Baron Greville. Algernon married Lady Beatrice Violet Graham (1842–1932) on 16 December 1863 and they had four children: Ronald (1864–1908), Camilla (1866–1938), Lilian (1869–1956) and Charles (1871–1952).

A drinking fountain monument, which originally stood on Dominick Street, was gifted to the people of Mullingar by Lord Greville in honour of his son Ronald who died in 1908, aged 43. Algernon died in 1909 and was then succeeded by his son Charles. The monument, which was refurbished in 2023, is located in the hotel's rooftop garden.

Ownership of the hotel has changed hands many times over the years beginning with the Greville family and ending with local businessman Christopher Maye as of 1981 who was the current owner alongside the Bridge House Hotel in Tullamore from 1971 to 2008. Greville Arms Hotel Company Limited, the current hotel company, was registered on 23 October 1996. Proprietor Christopher Maye died on 31 May 2025 at the Hermitage Clinic in Lucan.

=== Ulysses ===
Located adjacent to the hotel is Ulysses pub which is named in honour of James Joyce's novel, Ulysses. The building in which the pub is located was originally constructed as a house in c. 1820. It is accessible through the hotel as well as a main entrance on the street.

A life-sized wax figure of Joyce, which is located on the upper floor of the pub, was commissioned from the National Wax Museum by the hotel's management as a tribute to Joyce's 100th birthday and his connection to the hotel and town during his visits to the town with his father, John Stanislaus Joyce in the early 1900s. The figure, created using the death mask of the writer, was unveiled during the centenary celebrations on 21 March 1982 by local author and Joycean, Leo Daly. Every June, the hotel celebrates Bloomsday in memory of Joyce's life.

=== Museum ===
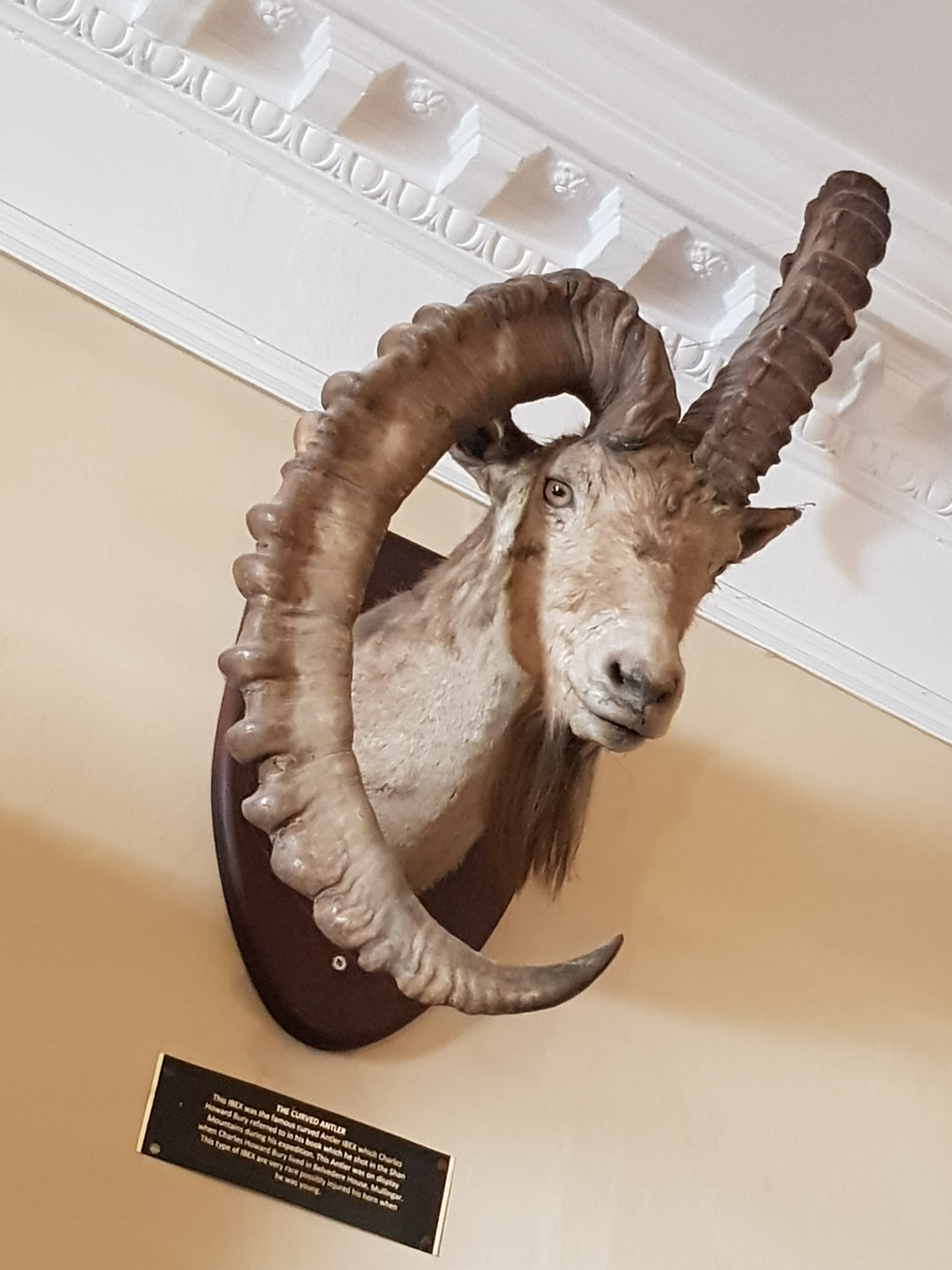
The mounted head of an ibex (with a curved horn), associated with Charles Howard-Bury, is displayed in the hotel's museum

In March 2012, a museum in the hotel officially opened to the public. The museum's collection includes the sculpture Penitent Magdalene in the manner of Antonio Canova which was acquired from Kenure House in 1964, a collection of coins over 200 years old, a Stone Age axe dated at being over 4,000 years old, gun money, an original copy of Ulysses, a large portrait painting of Robert Rochfort showing the "great mace of Irish government" which was created in 1655 as well as a collection of items belonging to Charles Howard-Bury who owned the nearby Belvedere estate. The latter collection includes the head of a bear that was on display at Belvedere for 50 years and two ibex heads; one of which has a damaged horn.
