= Charles Greville =

Charles Greville may refer to:

- Charles Francis Greville (1749–1809), British antiquarian, collector and member of parliament (MP) for Warwick
- Charles Greville (physician) (1695–1763), British physician
- Charles Greville (1762–1832), MP for Petersfield
- Charles John Greville, MP for Warwick
- Charles Greville (diarist) (1794–1865), English diarist and amateur cricketer
- Charles Greville, 3rd Baron Greville (1871–1952)
- Charles Greville, 7th Earl of Warwick (1911–1984), British peer

== See also ==
- Greville (disambiguation)
