= Greville =

Greville or Gréville may refer to:

== Places ==
- Gréville-Hague, in the Manche département, France
- Mount Greville, Queensland, Australia
- Port Greville, Nova Scotia, Canada

== People ==
First name

- Greville Janner (1928–2015), British Labour Party politician and alleged child abuser
- Greville Wynne (1919–1990) British businessman who spied on the USSR for the UK

Surname

- Greville (surname)
- Gréville (surname)

== See also ==
- Fulke Greville (disambiguation)
