= Baron Greville =

Title in the Peerage of the United Kingdom

Barony of Greville
- Arms: Sable, on a Cross engrailed Or, five Pellets, all within a Bordure engrailed Or. Crest: Out of a Ducal Coronet Gules, a Demi-Swan wings expanded and elevated Or. Supporters: On either side a Swan wings inverted Argent, ducally gorged Gules, charged on the breast with a Pellet.
- Creation date: 15 December 1869
- Created by: Victoria
- Peerage: Peerage of the United Kingdom
- First holder: Fulke Southwell Greville-Nugent, 1st Baron Greville
- Last holder: Ronald Charles Fulke Greville, 4th Baron Greville
- Remainder to: the 1st Baron’s heirs male of the body lawfully begotten
- Status: Extinct
- Extinction date: 9 December 1987
- Motto: VIX EA NOSTRA VOCO (I scarce call these things our own)

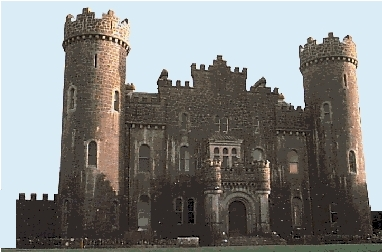
Clonyn Castle, County Westmeath.

Baron Greville, of Clonyn, County Westmeath, was a title in the Peerage of the United Kingdom. It was created on 15 December 1869 for the Liberal politician Fulke Greville-Nugent, Member of Parliament for County Longford from 1852 to 1869. Born Fulke Southwell Greville he was the grandson of Fulke Greville, son of the Honourable Algernon Greville, second son of Fulke Greville, 5th Baron Brooke (from whom the Greville Earls of Warwick are also descended; see this title for earlier history of the Greville family).

Lord Greville married Lady Rosa Emily Mary Anne Nugent (died 1883), only daughter George Nugent, 1st Marquess of Westmeath, and assumed by Royal licence the additional surname of Nugent in 1866. Through this marriage, The Nugent family seat of Clonyn Castle in County Westmeath came into this branch of the Greville family. Lord Greville was succeeded by his son in 1883. The second Baron was married to the writer Violet, Lady Greville. He was a Liberal politician and served as Private Secretary to Prime Minister William Ewart Gladstone from 1872 to 1873 and as a Lord of the Treasury from 1873 to 1874. In 1883, Lord Greville resumed by Royal licence the surname of Greville only. His eldest son the Honourable Ronald Greville represented Bradford East in Parliament but predeceased his father. On the second Baron's death, the title consequently passed to his only surviving son, the third Baron.

He was Military Secretary to the Governor-General of Australia, Lord Northcote, from 1904 to 1908. He was succeeded by his only son, the fourth Baron. He never married. Upon his death in 1987 the barony became extinct.

The Honourable Reginald Greville-Nugent, younger son of the first Baron, was also a politician. His son, Reginald Maugham, was a writer of Africa and British Consul-General in Senegal. Dame Margaret Greville, wife of the Hon. Ronald Greville, eldest son of the second Baron, was a society hostess and philanthropist.

== Barons Greville (1869) ==
- Fulke Southwell Greville-Nugent, 1st Baron Greville (1821–1883)
- Algernon William Fulke Greville, 2nd Baron Greville (1841–1909)
  - Hon. Ronald Henry Fulke Greville (1864–1908)
- Charles Beresford Fulke Greville, 3rd Baron Greville (1871–1952)
- Ronald Charles Fulke Greville, 4th Baron Greville (1912–1987)

== See also ==
- Earl of Warwick (1759 creation)
- Earl of Westmeath
