= William McEwan =

Scottish politician and brewer (1827–1913)

The Right Honourable William McEwan

Member of Parliament for Edinburgh Central
- In office 1886–1900
- Preceded by: John Wilson
- Succeeded by: George Mackenzie Brown

Personal details
- Born: 16 July 1827 Alloa, Scotland
- Died: 12 May 1913 (aged 85) Mayfair, London, England
- Resting place: Great Bookham, Surrey, England
- Party: Liberal
- Spouse: Helen Anderson (after 1885)
- Children: Dame Margaret Greville
- Education: Alloa Academy
- Occupation: Brewer and politician

William McEwan (/məˈkjuːən/ mə-KEW-ən; 16 July 1827 – 12 May 1913) was a Scottish politician and brewer. He founded the Fountain Brewery in 1856, served as a member of parliament (MP) from 1886 to 1900, and funded the construction of the McEwan Hall at the University of Edinburgh.

== Early life and brewing ==
McEwan was born in Alloa, Scotland in 1827, the third child of ship-owner John McEwan and his wife Anne Jeffrey. His older sister Janet married James Younger head of his local family brewing business in 1850, and their children included George, 1st Viscount Younger of Leckie, William Younger, and Robert, Baron Blanesburgh.

He was educated at Alloa Academy.

== Career ==
McEwan worked for the Alloa Coal Company and merchants Patersons. He worked in Glasgow for a commission agent and then as a bookkeeper for a spinning firm in Yorkshire.

From 1851 he received technical and management training from his uncles, John and David Jeffrey, proprietors of the Heriot brewery in Edinburgh. In 1856, he established the Fountain Brewery at Fountainbridge in Edinburgh with money from his mother and his uncle, Tom Jeffrey. After growing sales in Scotland, his nephew William Younger of Alloa began an apprenticeship with him and eventually became managing director. Exports were made to Australia, South Africa, New Zealand and India, with McEwan's having 90% of sales in north-eastern England by the turn of the century. The brewery became part of Scottish & Newcastle.

=== Political career ===
McEwan became a member of parliament for Edinburgh Central after the 1886 general election, representing the Liberal Party. He was returned unopposed in 1895 and continued to serve until 1900. He became a Privy Counsellor in 1907, but declined a title.

== Personal life ==
He married Helen Anderson in 1885 and they had one daughter born out of wedlock. His wife died in 1906 and was buried on the west side of Highgate Cemetery. Their daughter Margaret Helen (1863–1942) married the Hon. Ronald Greville, heir apparent to the Greville barony as the eldest son of Algernon Greville, 2nd Baron Greville.

He funded the McEwan Hall at the University of Edinburgh, to a cost of £115,000. It was opened in 1897, when McEwan was presented with an honorary doctorate and the freedom of the city of Edinburgh. He also presented paintings to the National Gallery of Scotland.

McEwan's final home was at Polesden Lacey in Surrey, which was purchased in 1906 for his daughter Margaret and her husband Ronald Greville. She bequeathed the house and estate to the National Trust in 1942 in memory of her father. He died in 1913 in Mayfair and was buried in the village of Great Bookham in Surrey. His estate was valued at £1.5 million.

== Gallery ==
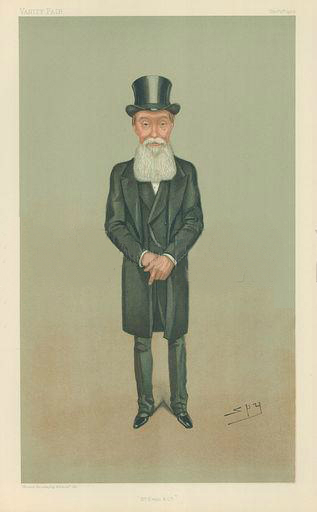
Vanity Fair, 1902

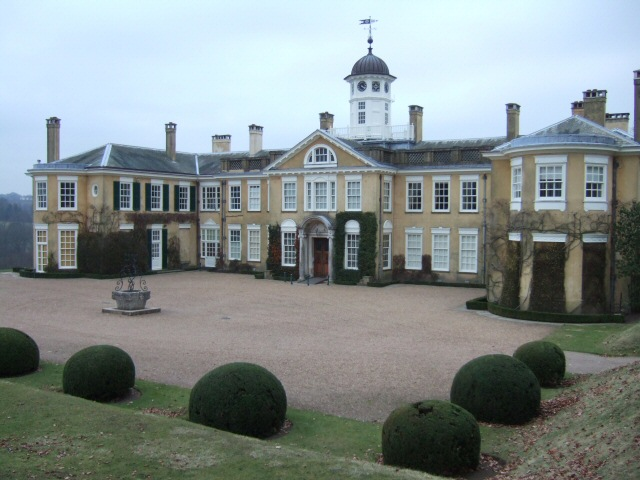
Polesden Lacey in Surrey was McEwan's final home and was bequeathed to the National Trust in his name.

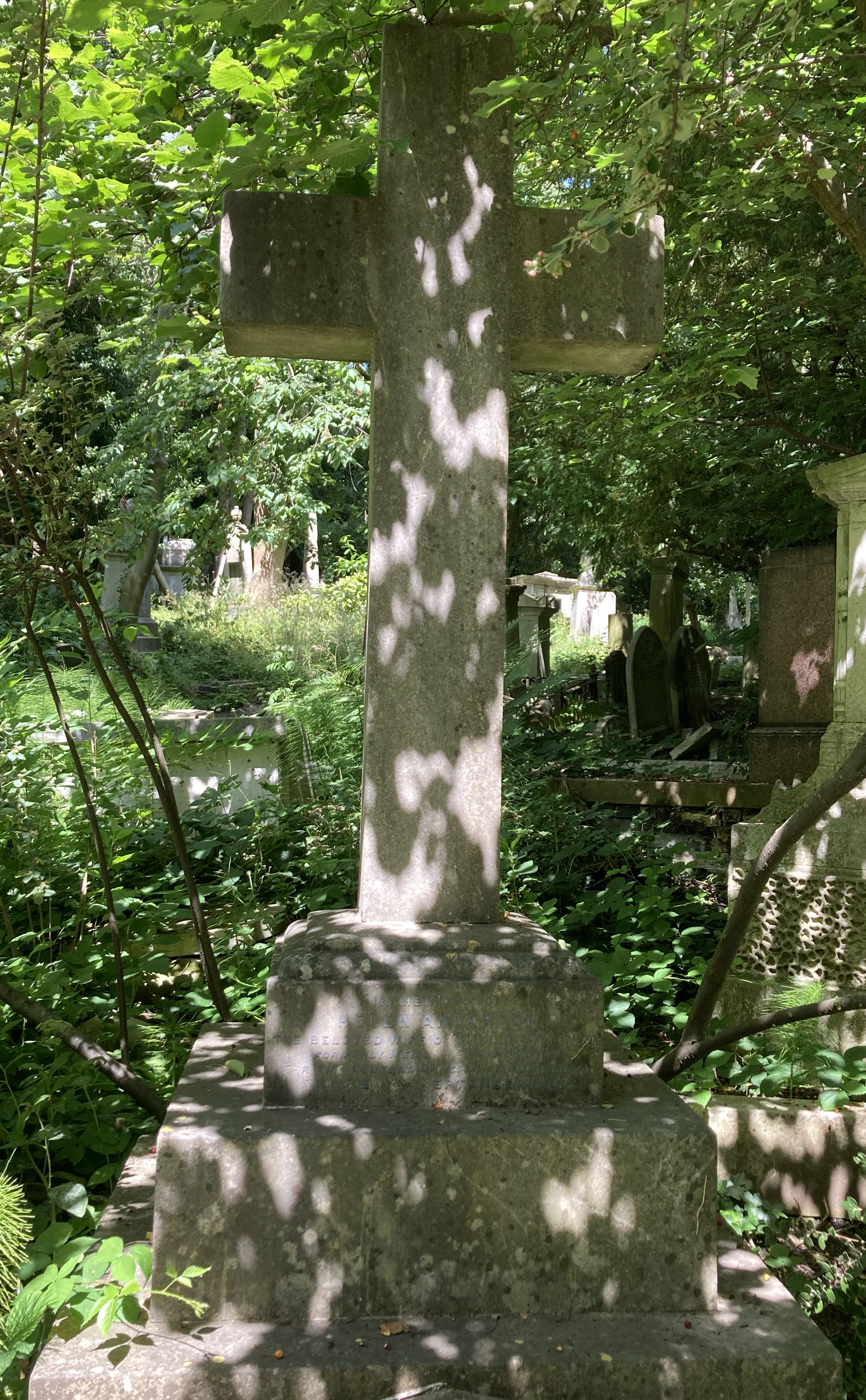
Grave of Helen Anderson McEwan in Highgate Cemetery

== Footnotes ==
Parliament of the United Kingdom
| Preceded by John Wilson | Member of Parliament for Edinburgh Central; 1886–1900 | Succeeded by George Mackenzie Brown |
