= Polesden Lacey =

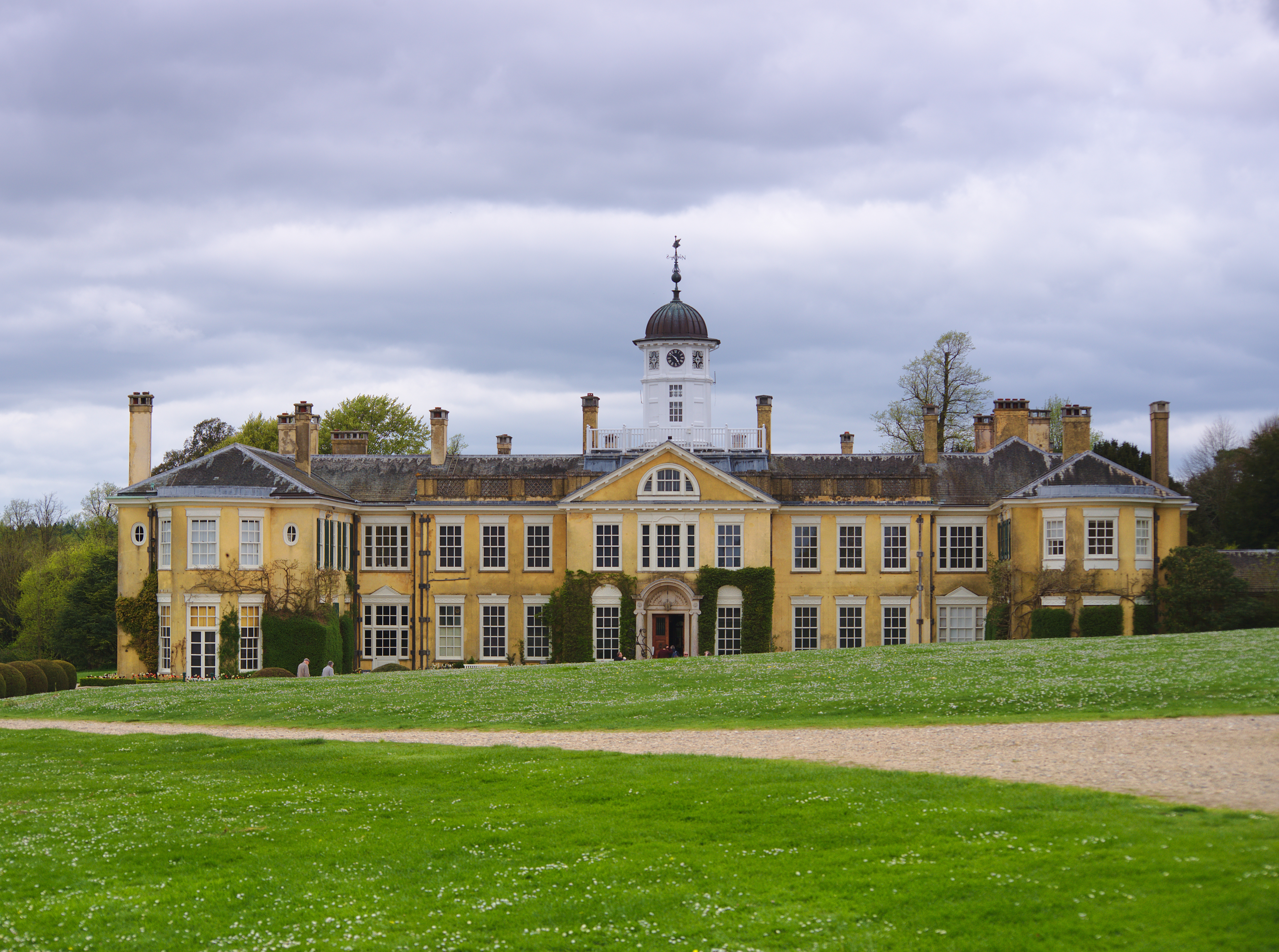
- East facade

- Location within Surrey
- 51°15′27″N 0°22′25″W
- Type: Country house
- Location: Great Bookham

History
- Built: 1824

Site notes
- Area: Surrey
- Architects: Thomas Cubitt; Ambrose Poynter
- Architectural style: Regency
- Owner: National Trust

Listed Building – Grade II*
- Official name: Polesden Lacey
- Designated: 7 September 1951
- Reference no.: 1028665

Polesden Lacey is an Edwardian house and estate, located on the North Downs at Great Bookham, near Dorking, Surrey, England. It is owned and run by the National Trust and is one of the Trust's most popular properties.

This Regency house was expanded from an earlier building, and extensively remodelled in 1906 by Margaret Greville, a well-known Edwardian hostess. Her collection of fine paintings, furniture, porcelain and silver is displayed in the reception rooms and galleries, as it was at the time of her celebrated house parties. The future George VI and Queen Elizabeth spent part of their honeymoon there in 1923.

The 1,400-acre (570 ha) estate includes a walled rose garden, lawns, ancient woodland and landscape walks.

== History ==
The name 'Polesden' is thought to be Old English. The first house was built here by 1336. Anthony Rous bought the estate in 1630 and rebuilt the medieval house. The house was owned by the Rous family until 1723, when the estate was purchased by the economist and politician Arthur Moore. An octagonal pavilion was added to the south front at this time.

In 1747 Sir Francis Geary, 1st Baronet purchased the estate, and subsequently spent his retirement there. Richard Brinsley Sheridan, the poet and playwright, came to live there in 1797 and began work to improve the building. However this effort was counter-productive and in 1818 Joseph Bonsor, a stationer and bookseller, bought the estate. He commissioned Thomas Cubitt to build an entirely new house in 1821–23, creating the core of the house seen today. Bonsor died in 1835, and the house passed to his son who, in 1853, sold the estate to Sir Walter Farquhar, 3rd Baronet, who held it until his death in 1902.

== Early 20th-century ==
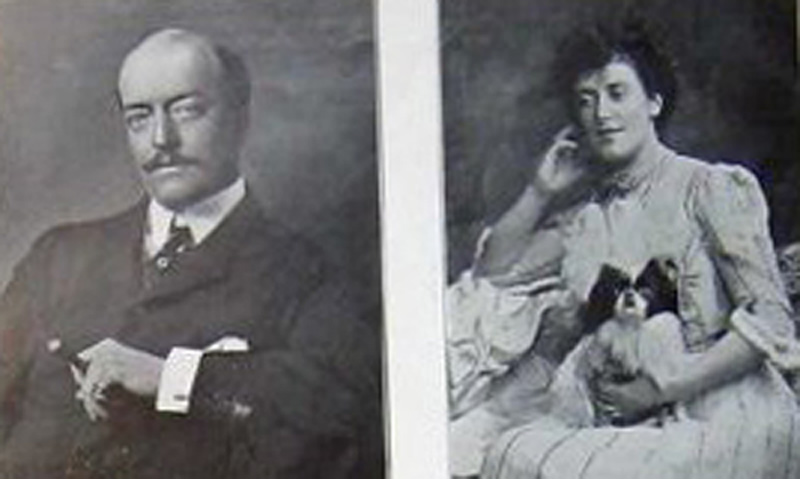
Ronald and Margaret Greville, c. 1900

The Polesden Lacey estate was purchased in 1902 by Sir Clinton Edward Dawkins, a civil servant who worked in the Colonial Office. He commissioned Ambrose Poynter, architect son of Sir Edward Poynter, to significantly extend Cubitt's work to create the present-day house. Sir Clinton, however died in 1905, shortly after its completion.

The estate was then bought in 1906 by William McEwan, for his daughter, Margaret Greville. Architects Charles Mewès and Arthur Davis, who were responsible for The Ritz Hotel, London, remodelled the house for the Grevilles. The couple filled the house with collections of fine furniture, porcelain, silver and art. Ronald Greville died in 1908 only two years after they had moved to Polesden Lacey. He was aged 46.

Margaret continued to entertain lavishly at the house. She also owned a home in London in which she held expensive parties. Over the next 30 years her reputation as an Edwardian society hostess became established.

=== Royal honeymoon at Polesden Lacey in 1923 ===
In 1923 Margaret invited the Duke and Duchess of York to spend their honeymoon at Polesden Lacey and the royal couple subsequently spent two weeks there. Shortly before their arrival, The Illustrated London News took photographs of the house and published a large feature article about the proposed honeymoon venue.

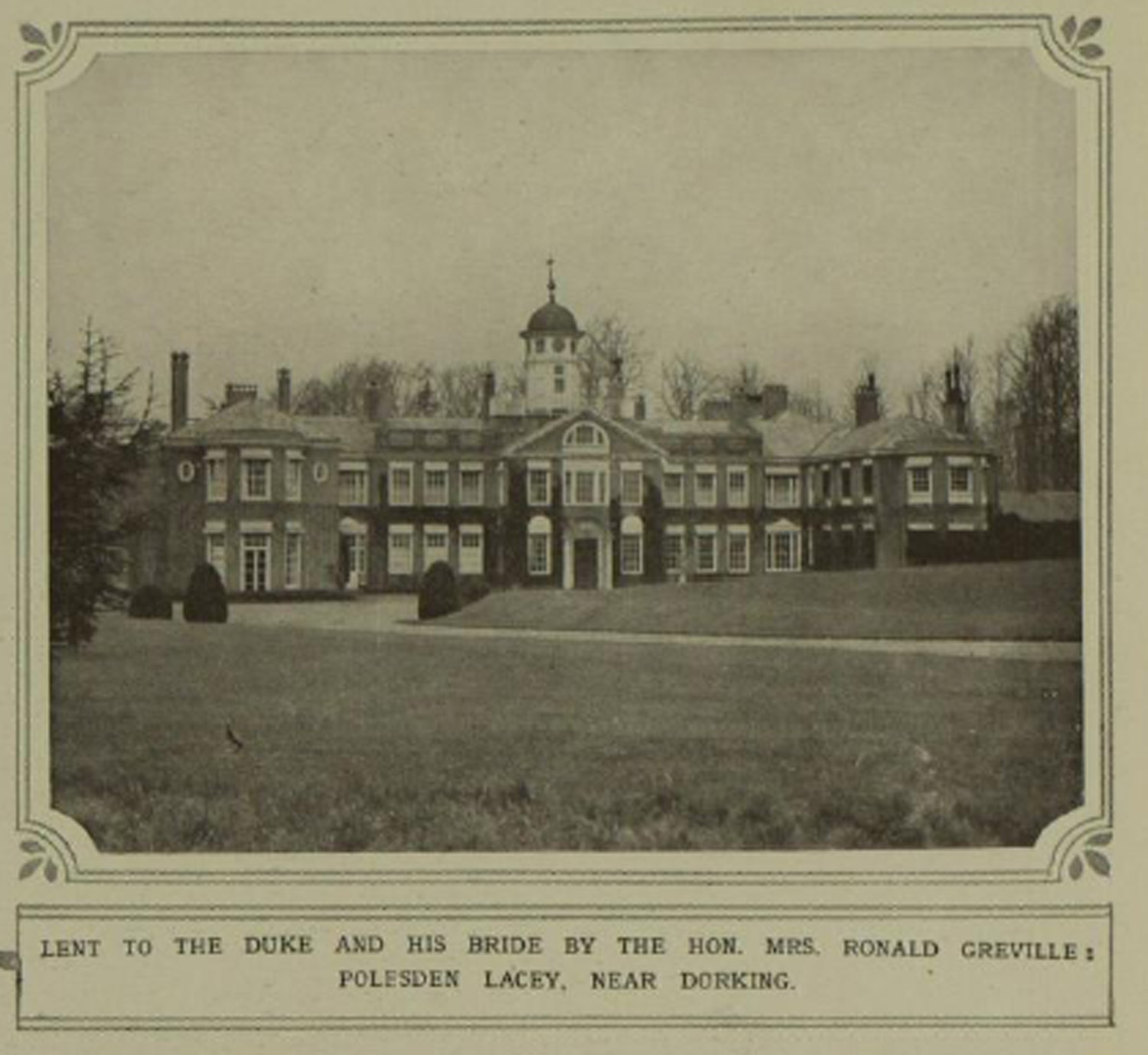

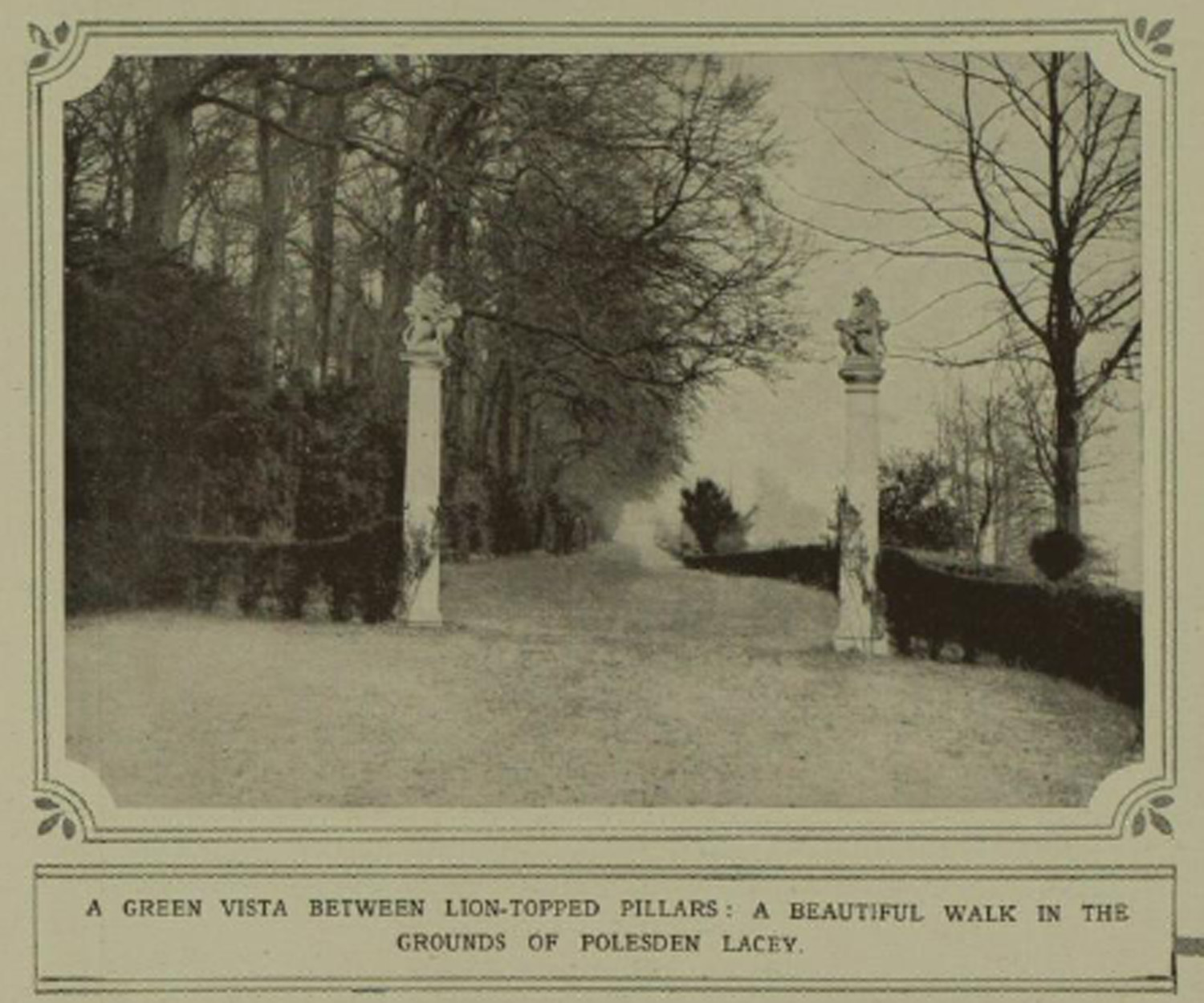

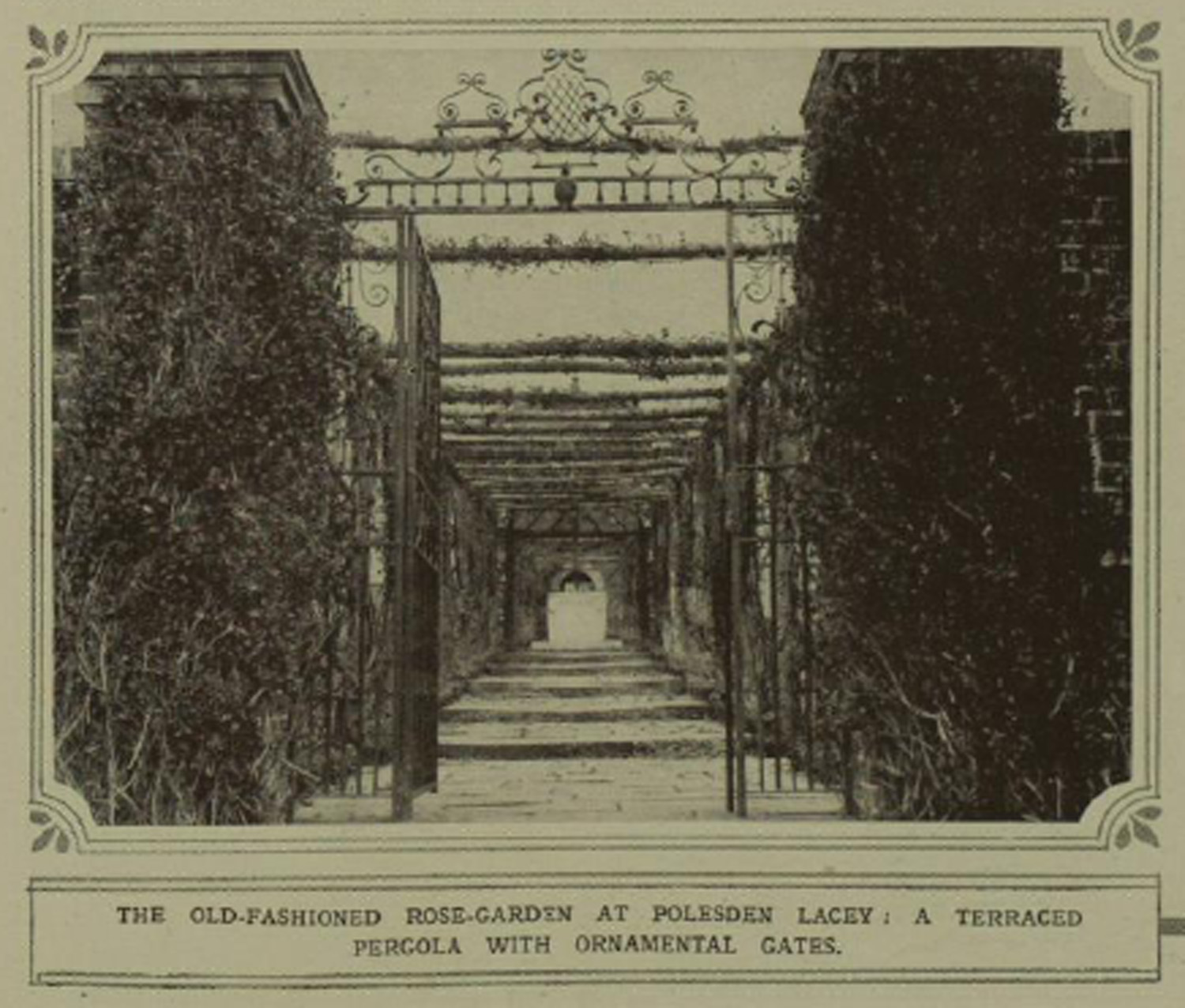

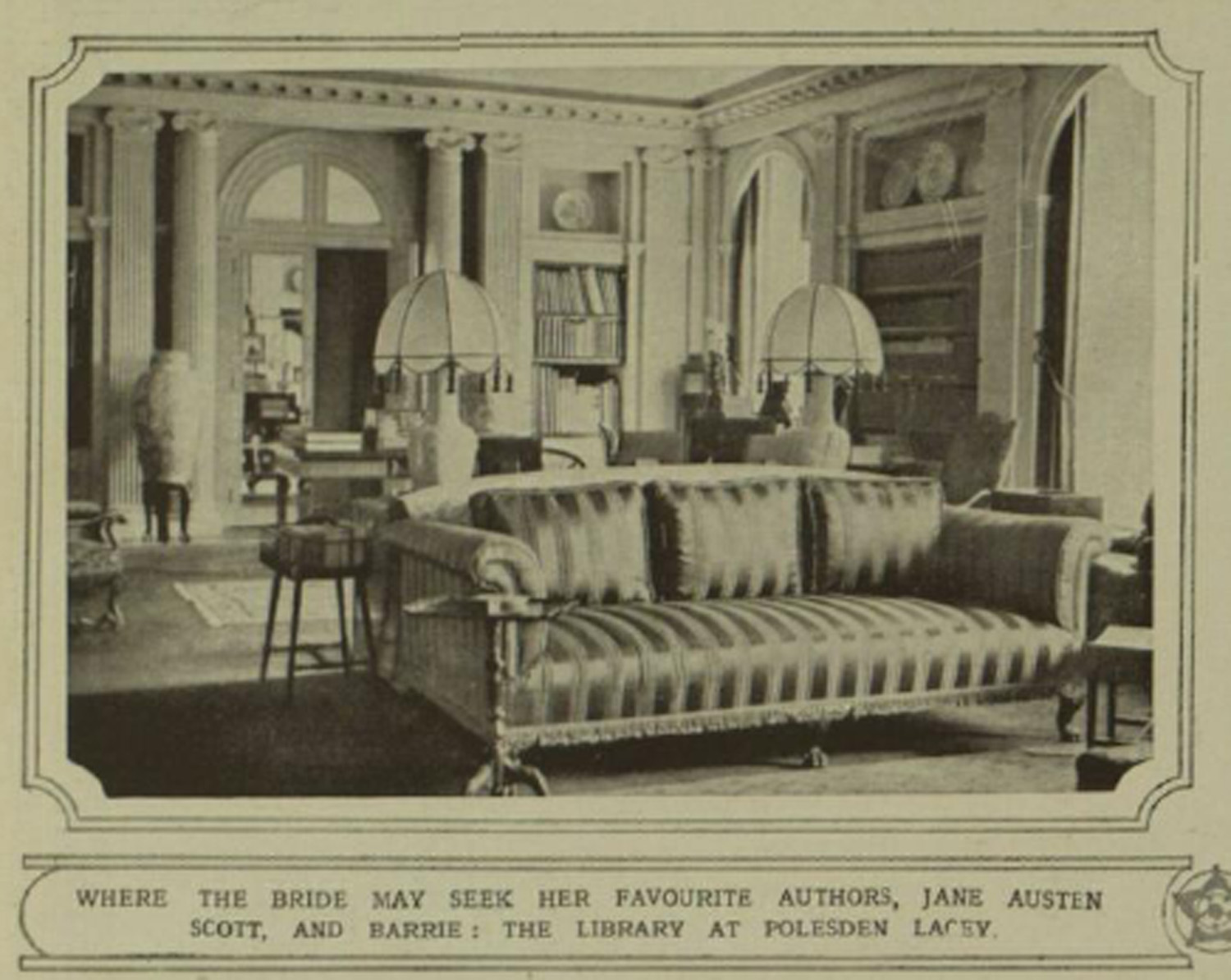

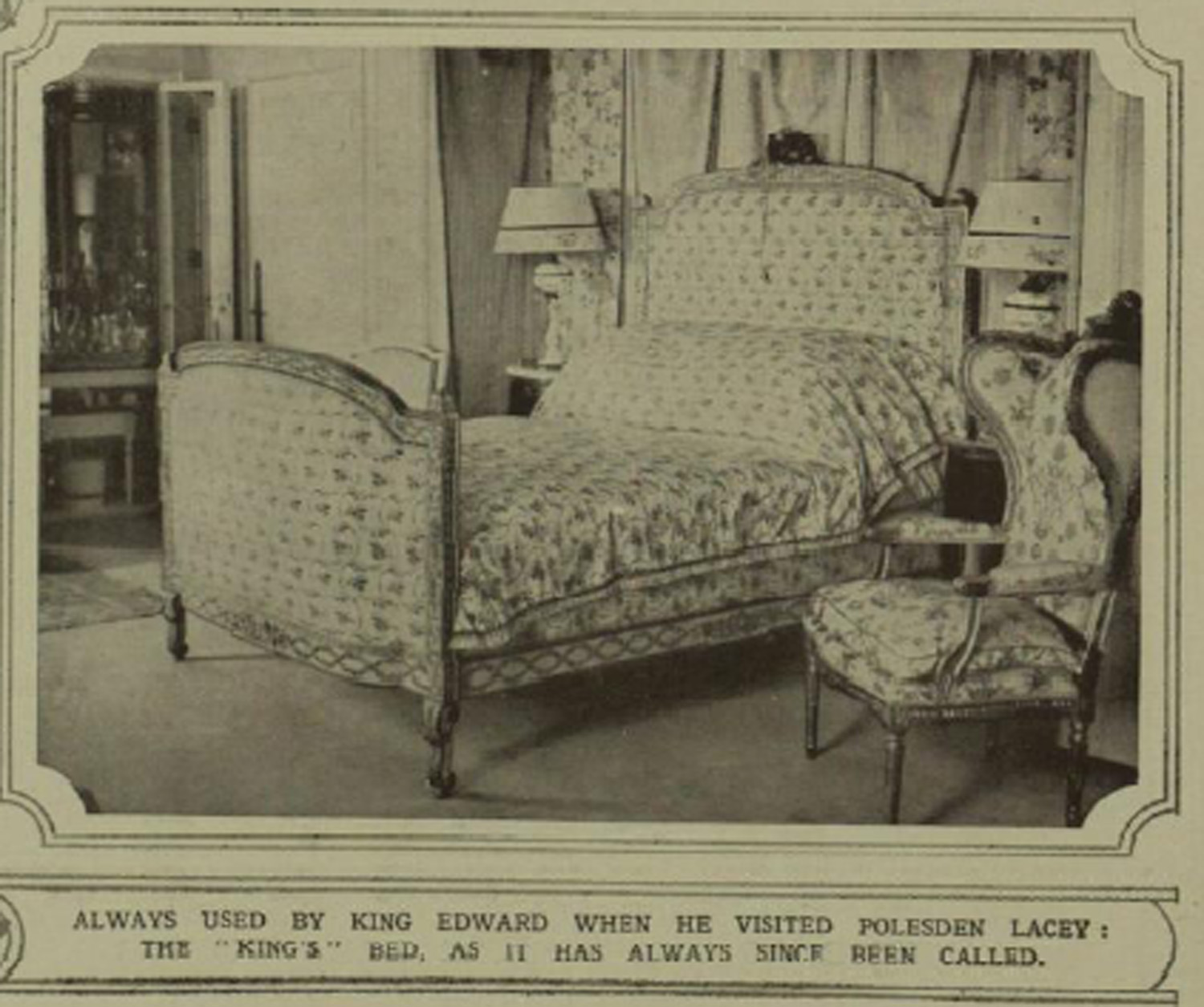

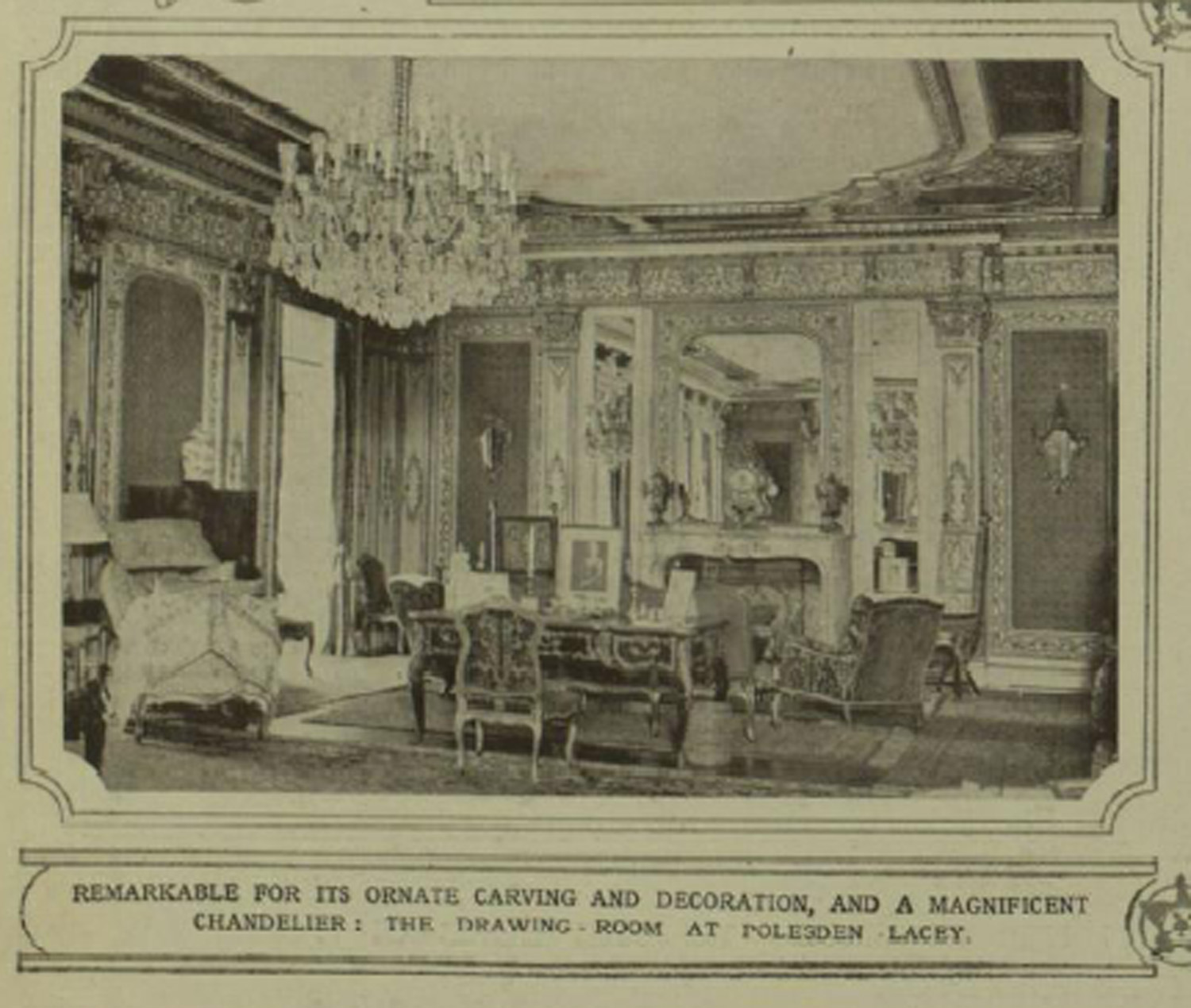

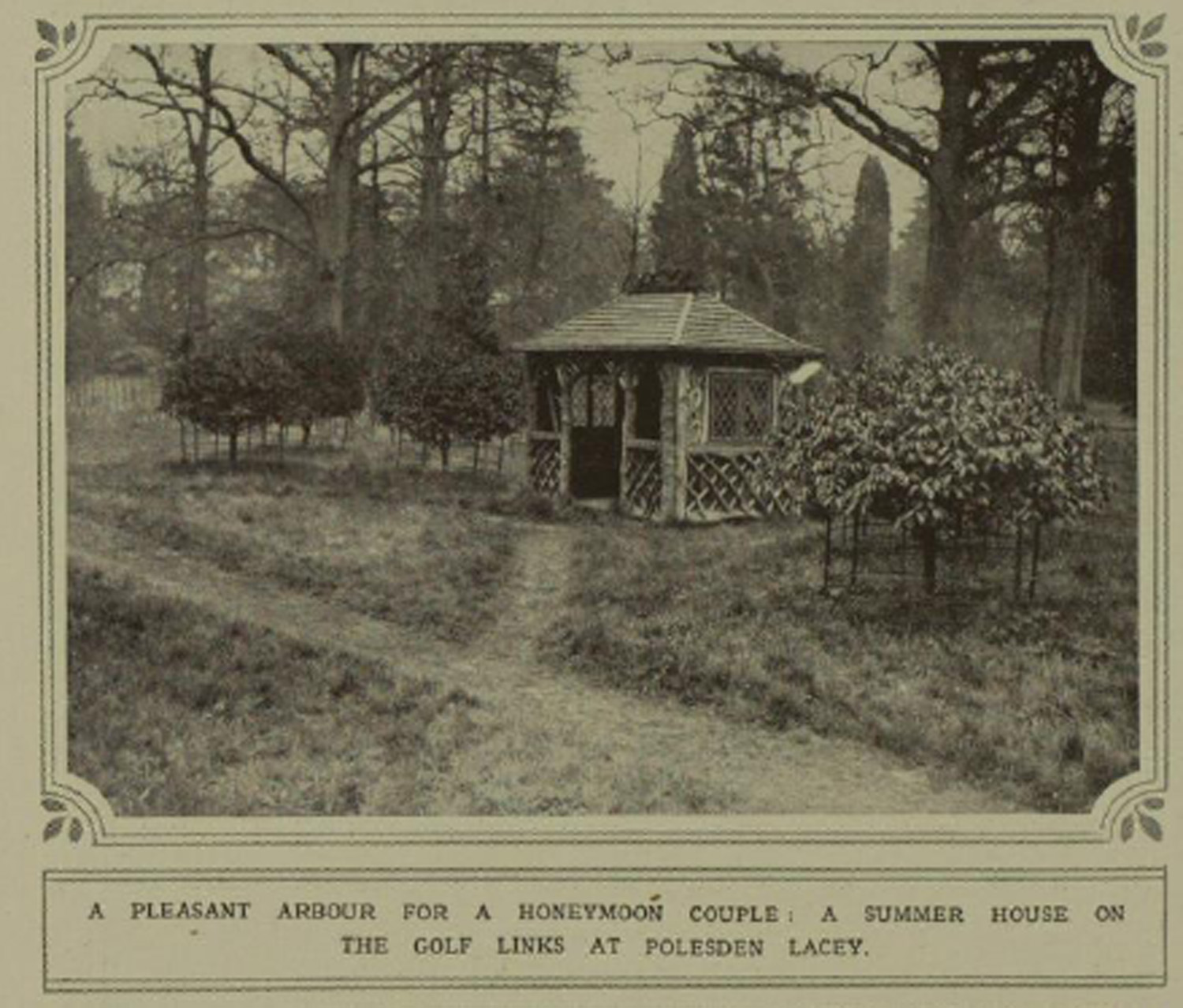

== National Trust ownership (1942 – present) ==
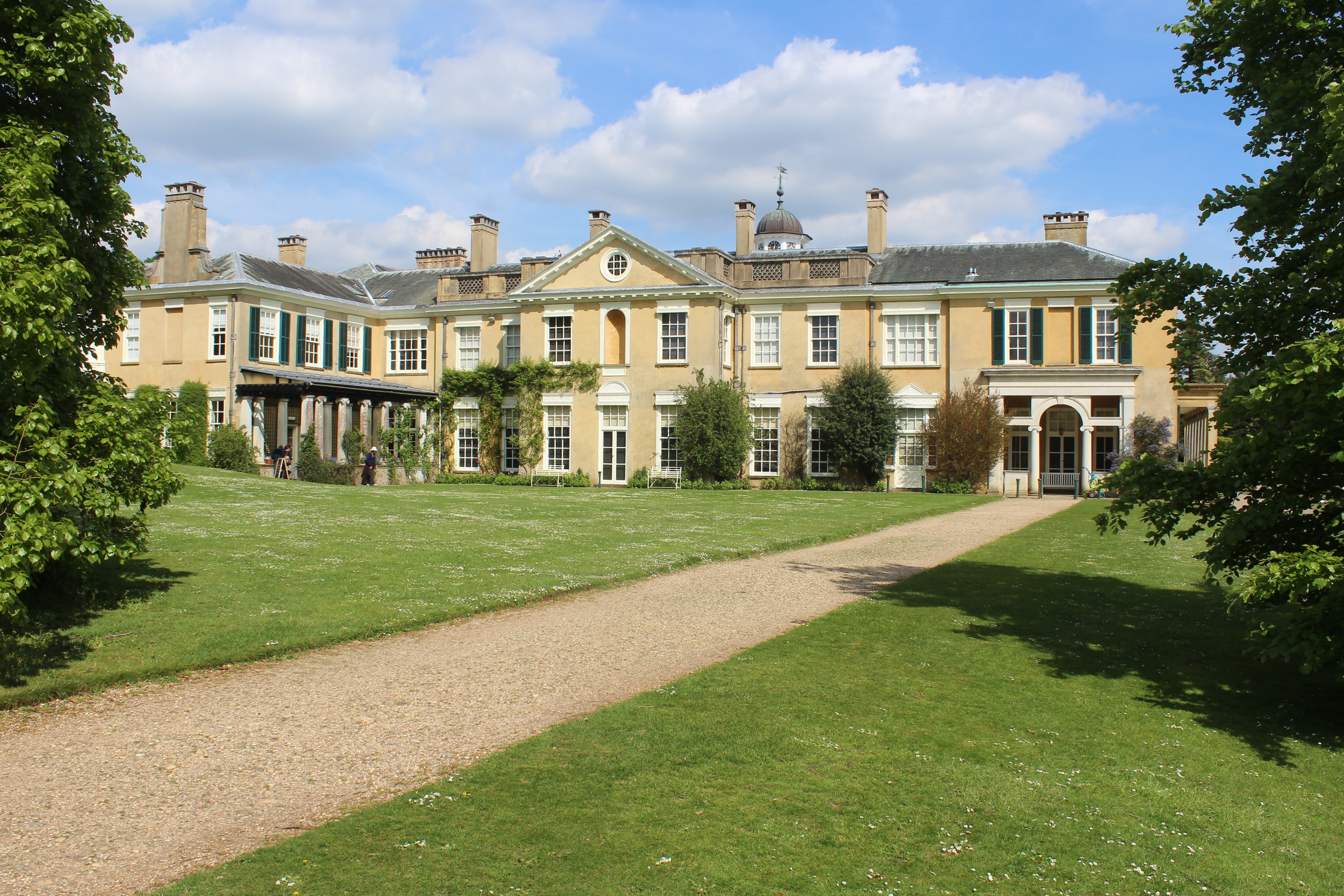
West facade

Polesden Lacey was left to the National Trust by Mrs Greville in 1942 in memory of her father, the brewer William McEwan. (She was his illegitimate daughter and sole heir.) The bequest included approximately 1,000 acres (400 ha) of land along with paintings and items of furniture, which she hoped would form the basis of a future art gallery. Her jewellery collection was bequeathed to the Queen Mother.

The house was first opened to the public by the Trust in 1948. In August 1960, a fire destroyed around half of the roof of the property. Several ground floor ceilings were damaged by water during attempts to extinguish the blaze, however the collection of art and furniture was rescued by estate workers. The cost of repairs, some £65,000, was covered by insurance and the house reopened to the public on 9 June 1962.

In 1995 the National Trust embarked on a programme of restoration and renovation. In 2008/9 the visitor facilities were re-furbished, with a new car park, cafe, shop and farm shop. However, not all of the house is open to the public, including many bedrooms and servants' areas. From the 1970s to 2015, some of these closed off spaces are used as offices; there is hope that more will be restored and opened for visitors in the future. This process began in March 2011, with the opening of Mrs Greville's private apartment.

Polesden Lacey received over 287,000 visitors in 2020/21, placing it in the Trust's top ten most-visited properties.

== Estate ==
There are a number of walks around the Polesden Lacey estate, especially in the valley that the main house overlooks. The estate includes a Youth Hostel, called Tanners Hatch. Polesden Lacey also has open-air performing facilities, which are used during the summer to host various musical and theatrical events. In 2009 there was the Polesden Lacey Festival. In 2016 a campsite was opened on the estate.

== In popular culture ==
Polesden Lacey has been used as a filming location, including for the 1991 drama film Close My Eyes and the BBC television series Antiques Roadshow.

American musician Glaive’s fifth studio album is titled after the house and features it on its cover art.
