= Greville-Nugent =

Greville-Nugent is a surname, and may refer to:

- Fulke Greville-Nugent, 1st Baron Greville (1821–1883), Irish politician
- George Greville-Nugent (1842–1897), Irish politician
- Reginald Greville-Nugent (1848–1878), Irish politician

== See also ==
- Greville (surname)
