= Alloa Academy =

Coordinates: 56.108523°N 3.794682°W

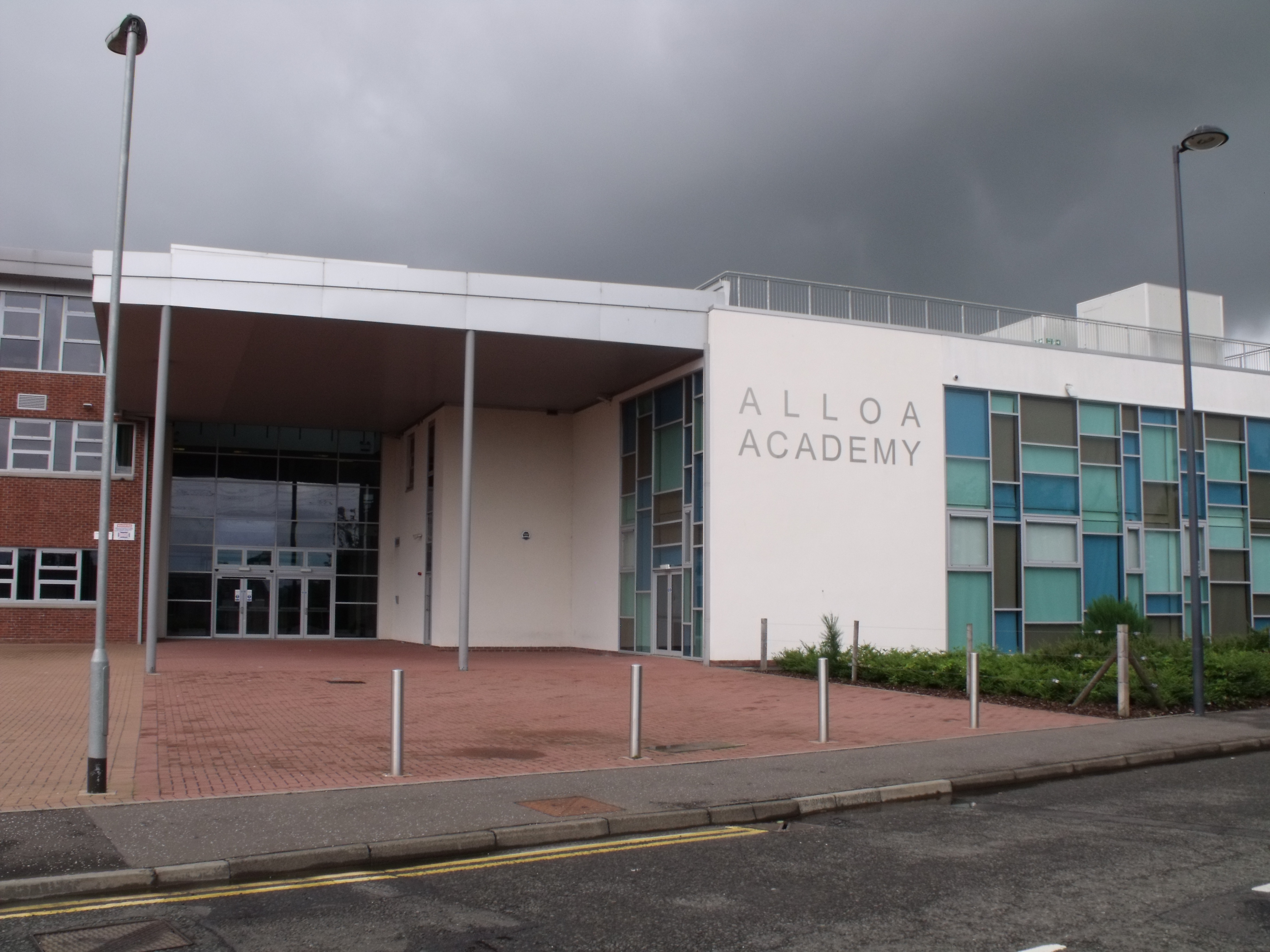
- The "New" building near the River Forth

Location
- Bowhouse Road; Alloa, Clackmannanshire, FK10 1DN; Scotland

Information
- Type: Coeducational Secondary
- Religious affiliation: Non-denominational
- Established: 1859; 167 years ago
- Headteacher: Steven McGuckin
- Age: 11 to 18
- Enrolment: 761
- Houses: Bruce, Erskine and Schaw
- Colours: Maroon and white
- School Years: S1 to S6
- Feeder schools: Redwell, Sunnyside, St. Mungo's and Park
- Website: https://www.alloaacademy.co.uk/

Alloa Academy is a six-year state-funded school, serving the town of Alloa in Clackmannanshire, Scotland. The pupil intake comes from four "feeder" primary schools, Redwell, Sunnyside, St. Mungo's and Park, and varies from a middle class area to an area of severe deprivation. The school moved to its current location after Christmas 2008. The old building in the Claremont area of Alloa was built in 1859, opened by Queen Victoria and demolished in 2010. The new school is adjacent to the OI Glassworks (formerly United Glass). The school is in view of the River Forth.

== Notable former pupils ==
Notable former pupils include:

- Dougie Brown, England and Scotland cricketer
- John Crawford Buchan, won the Victoria Cross during the Ludendorff offensive in March 1918
- James Lennox Dawson, won the Victoria Cross at Loos in World War I
- Dr Ian Alexander Forbes FRSE (1915-1986) industrial chemist, managing director of the Distillers Company Ltd 1966-1980
- Charles Forte, Baron Forte, founder of Trust House Forte hotel group
- William McEwan, brewer (uncle of George and Robert Younger) and Liberal politician
- George Younger, Lord Blanesborough, principal delegate at the World War I reparations committee
