= Harri Greville =

Wales international rugby league footballer

Personal information
- Full name: Harri Greville
- Born: 28 November 1990 (age 35) Cardiff, Wales

Playing information
- Weight: 16 st 8 lb (105 kg)
- Position: Prop
Club
Years	Team	Pld	T	G	FG	P
2010–11	Scorpions	23	2	0	0	8
Representative
Years	Team	Pld	T	G	FG	P
2010	Wales	1	0	0	0	0

Harri Greville (born 28 November 1990) is a Welsh former professional rugby league footballer who played in the 2010s. He played at representative level for Wales, and at club level for South Wales Scorpions in the Rugby League National Championship 1, as a prop.

== International honours ==
Harri Greville won a cap for Wales while at South Wales Scorpions in 2010.
