= Fulke Greville (disambiguation) =

Fulke Greville may refer to:

- Fulke Greville, 4th Baron Willoughby de Broke (c.1526–1606)
- Sir Fulke Greville (1536–1606)
- Fulke Greville, 1st Baron Brooke (1554–1628), Elizabethan poet, dramatist and statesman
- Fulke Greville, 5th Baron Brooke, British Member of Parliament for Warwick, father of Francis Greville
- Fulke Greville, 6th Baron Brooke (1693–1711), son of English politician Francis Greville
- Fulke Greville (1717–1806), member of Parliament for Monmouth Boroughs and British ambassador to Bavaria. Son of William, 7th Baron Brooke, and nephew of Fulke, the 6th Baron.
- Robert Fulke Greville (1751–1824, also recorded as R. Fulke Greville), army officer, member of Parliament, and equerry to King George III. Son of Francis, 1st Earl Warwick, and great-grandson of Fulke, 6th Baron Brooke.
- Fulke Greville-Nugent, 1st Baron Greville (1821–1883), Irish politician, member of Parliament for County Longford. Great-grandson of Fulke the ambassador.
