= Gréville (surname) =

Gréville is a surname, and may refer to:

- Edmond T. Gréville (1906–1966), French film director and screenwriter
- Henry Gréville (1842–1902), French writer
- Vanda Gréville (1908–1997), British film actress

== See also ==
- Greville (surname)
