= Margaret Greville =

British socialite (1863–1942)

Dame Margaret Greville DBE
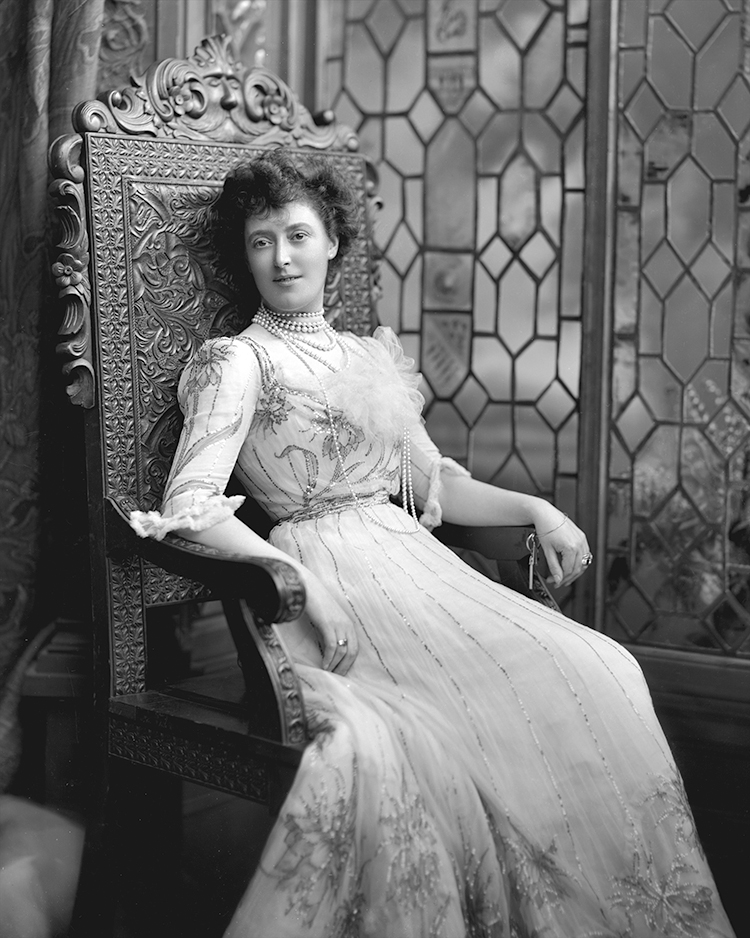
- Greville in 1900
- Born: Margaret Helen Anderson; 20 December 1863
- Died: 15 September 1942 (aged 78); The Dorchester, London, England
- Title: The Honourable Mrs Greville
- Spouse: Ronald Greville
- Father: William McEwan

Dame Margaret Helen Greville, DBE (née Anderson; 20 December 1863 – 15 September 1942), was a British society hostess and philanthropist.

== Family background ==
Born Margaret Helen Anderson, she was the daughter of William McEwan, a brewery multimillionaire, later elected as an MP (Member of Parliament) for Edinburgh Central; and his mistress, Helen Anderson (1835/1836–1906), a cook, who was married to William Anderson, a porter at McEwan's brewery in Edinburgh. Following William Anderson's death in 1885, William McEwan married Helen later the same year, when Margaret was 21.

== Society hostess ==
In 1891, Margaret Anderson married the Hon. Ronald Greville, elder son of Algernon Greville, 2nd Baron Greville and the former Lady Violet Graham. In 1906, her father purchased Polesden Lacey in Great Bookham, Surrey for her and her husband. Her husband died two years later, and her father (who also lived at Polesden Lacey) in 1913. Margaret became known at Polesden Lacey as a society hostess; and was a close friend of Queen Mary. She received proposals of marriage from Sir Evelyn Ruggles-Brise and (in 1917) from the 1st Viscount Simon, but declined both.

She was named a Dame Commander of the Order of the British Empire (DBE) in 1922.

Writing in 1933, Jean, wife of Sir Ian Hamilton wrote that at a dinner, Violet Bonham-Carter had "a violent discussion" with Greville about how Hitler was threatening Jewish people. In 1934, Greville attended a Nuremberg Rally, and returned to England reportedly "full of enthusiasm for Hitler", and visited Germany twice more in the late 1930s.

== Death and bequests ==
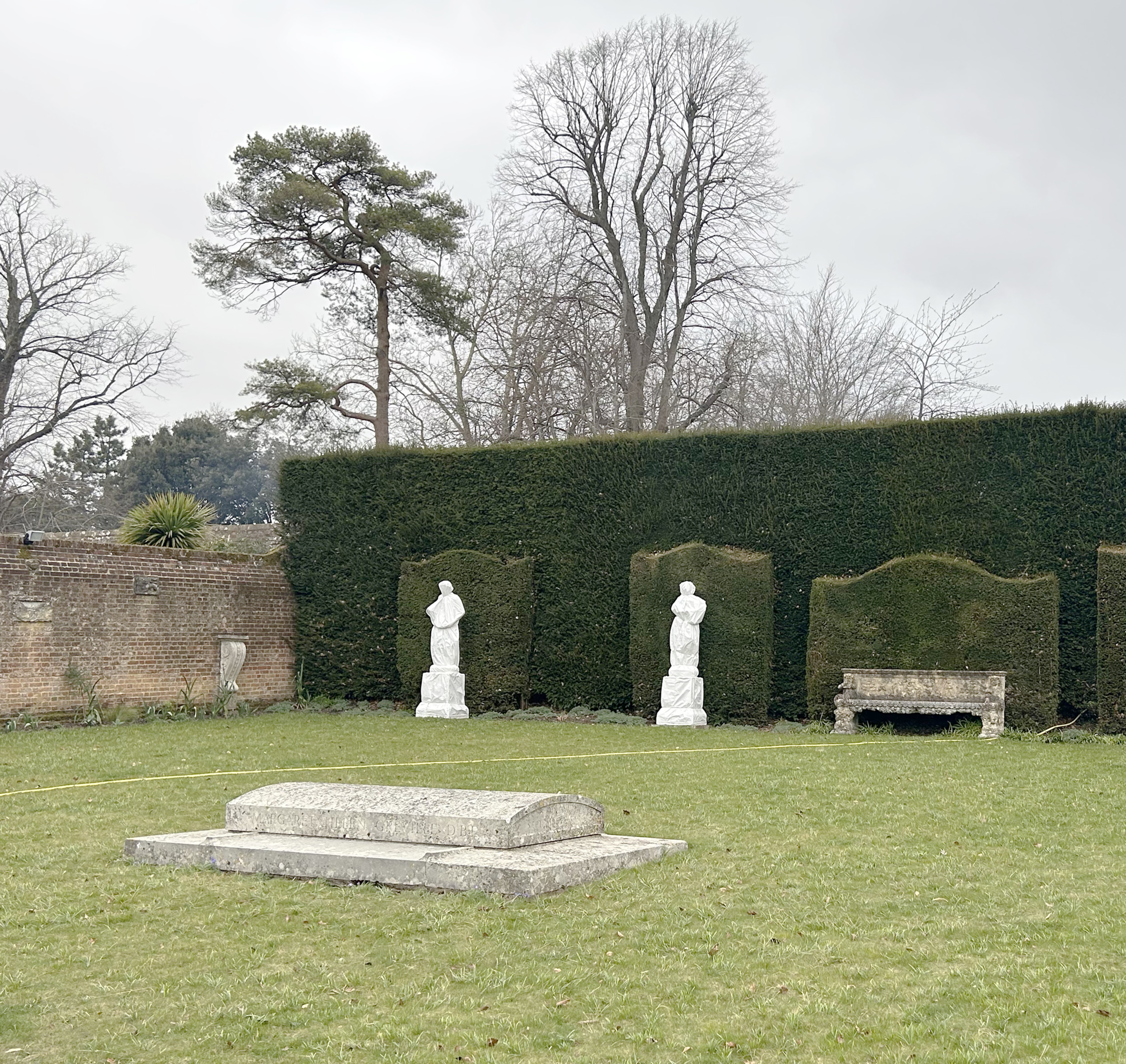
The grave of Margaret Greville at Polesden Lacey

Greville and her husband had no children. She died in 1942, and is buried in the grounds of Polesden Lacey.

She bequeathed her house with its contents (described in an inventory completed in 1943) and estate to the National Trust in memory of her father. Among the various items, paintings and other works are generally referred to as the "McEwan bequest", and are listed on the Art UK website with the text "bequeathed with Polesden Lacey by Dame Margaret Greville, in memory of her father William McEwan, 1942".

She bequeathed all her jewels to Queen Elizabeth (later the Queen Mother), including a diamond necklace reputedly belonging to Marie Antoinette, a pair of diamond chandelier earrings and selection of tiaras and a ruby necklace by Boucheron, all of which remain in the possession of the British royal family. The jewels were presented in a black tin box. To this day, the full extent of the collection is still unknown.

One notable item is the honeycomb-patterned diamond tiara (often referred to as the "Greville Tiara") which was a favourite of the Queen Mother, and in recent years has been worn frequently by Queen Camilla.

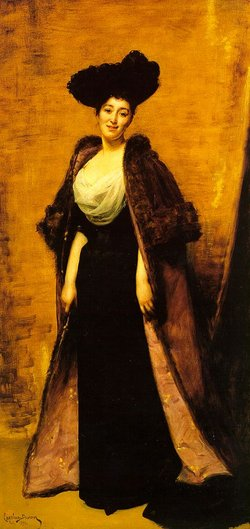
Margret Greville's society portrait, which hangs on the loggia staircase at Polesden Lacey

Another tiara, an emerald kokoshnik, was worn by Princess Eugenie at her wedding to Jack Brooksbank in October 2018. The platinum and diamond tiara was made by Parisian jeweller Boucheron in 1919. It features a 93.70 carat cabochon cut emerald in the centre surrounded by a halo of rose cut diamonds and six smaller emeralds graduating either side of the large central emerald.

Greville also left £20,000 to Princess Margaret (equivalent to £814,736 in 2025), and £25,000 to Queen Victoria Eugenie of Spain.

== Reputation ==
Following Greville's death, the Queen Mother, who had inherited her huge jewelry collection, described her as "so shrewd, so kind and so amusingly unkind, so sharp, such fun, so naughty; altogether a real person, a character, utterly Mrs Ronald Greville".

By contrast, Sir Cecil Beaton described her as "a galumphing, greedy, snobbish old toad who watered her chops at the sight of royalty ... and did nothing for anybody except the rich".

James Lees-Milne, in his diaries, commented: "Everyone is agog to hear the terms of Mrs G's will. She was a lady who loved the great because they were great, and apparently had a tongue dipped in gall. I remember old Lady Leslie exclaiming, 'Maggie Greville! I would sooner have an open sewer in my drawing room!'"

== Bibliography ==
- Davenport-Hines, Richard (2015) [2004]. "Greville [née Anderson], Dame Margaret Helen (1863–1942)". Oxford Dictionary of National Biography (online ed.). Oxford University Press. doi:10.1093/ref:odnb/51986. (Subscription, Wikipedia Library access or UK public library membership required.)
