= Violet Greville, Lady Greville =

British aristocrat, novelist and playwright (1842-1932)

The Right Honourable The Lady Greville
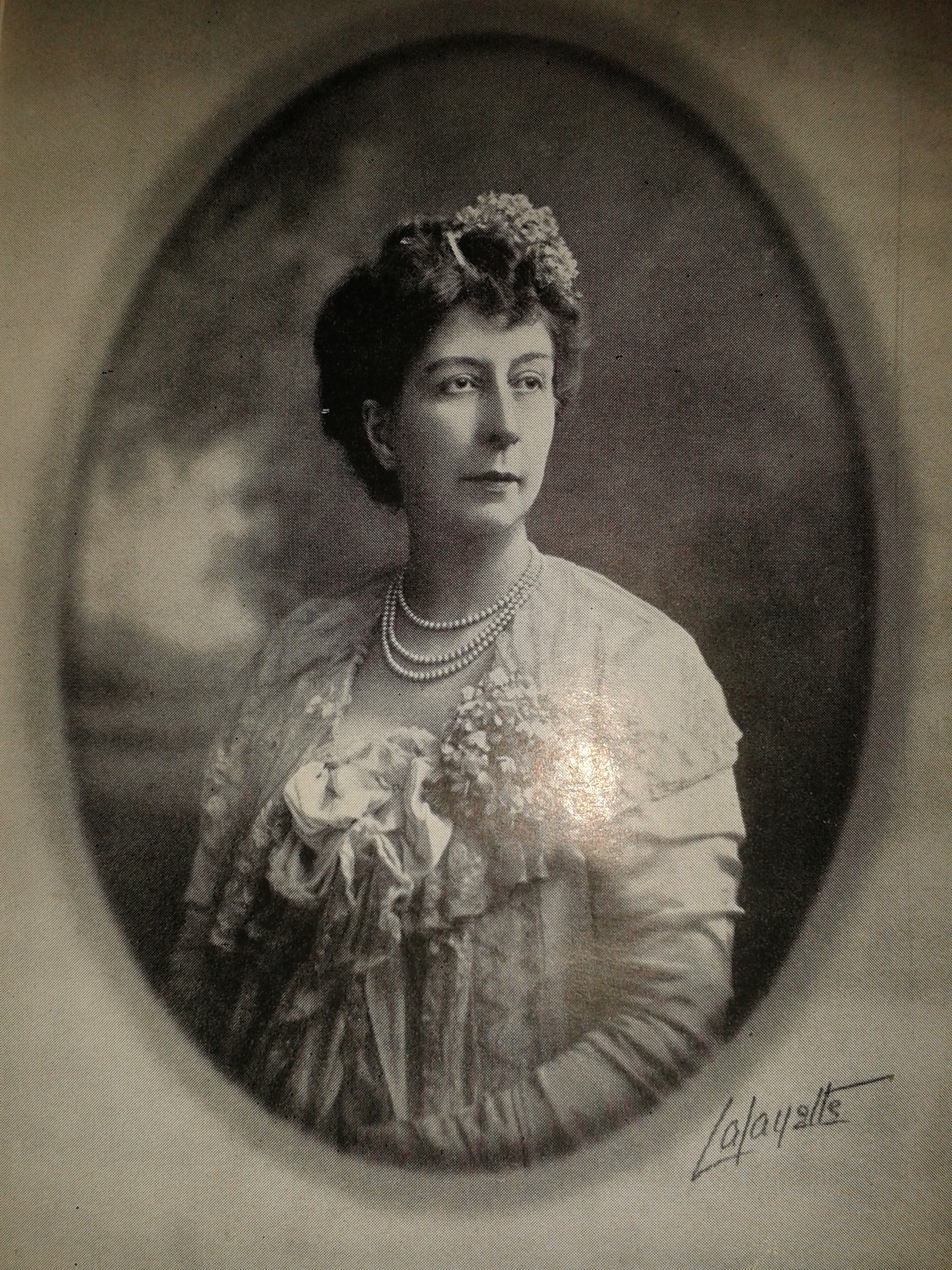
- Born: 13 February 1842; Sulby, Northamptonshire
- Died: 29 February 1932 (aged 90); Bournemouth
- Spouse: Algernon Greville, 2nd Baron Greville
- Issue: 4, including Hon. Ronald Henry Fulke Greville and Charles Greville, 3rd Baron Greville
- Parents: James Graham, 4th Duke of Montrose; Hon. Caroline Horsley-Beresford
- Occupation: writer, novelist and playwright

Beatrice Violet Greville, Baroness Greville (born Lady Beatrice Violet Graham; 13 February 1842 – 29 February 1932) was a British aristocrat, novelist and playwright.

== Life ==
Greville was born at the now demolished Sulby Hall at Sulby, Northamptonshire. Her parents were the politician James Graham, 4th Duke of Montrose and the racehorse owner, former Hon. Caroline Agnes Horsley-Beresford (third daughter of John Horsley-Beresford, 2nd Baron Decies). She is said to have had a perfect childhood at Buchanan Castle, the house her father had built.

She disappointed her father when she married and she had to leave the family home. Her husband's ancestral home did not compare to her own but he became a member of parliament and in 1883 he became the second Baron Greville and she became Lady Greville. She was able to enjoy London society where she met Oscar Wilde, Adelina Patti and the painter James Whistler.

After she and her husband separated, her writing which she had been contributing to magazines anonymously for many years, became financially important. She met Edmund Yates at a party who was the editor of the society newspaper, The World. After Yates shared his patronising approach to her and her type, she revealed that she was the anonymous writer from whom he had been requesting work for the last two years. Prompted by Yates's surprise that she was not a man, she decided to write under her own name in future.

She would in time write seven novels which include references to the plight of women. One novel The Home for Failures which she published in 1896 deals in particular with the problems facing wives who are separated from their husbands.

She took an interest in the stage and she did some acting. In 1892 she published a play, Nadia, about the disgraceful rape of a woman by officers who ignore their victim's plight whilst taking pride in their own reputations. The audience did not like the subject matter. In 1899 she published a play "Old Friends: An Original One Act Comedy".

In 1927 she published her memoirs under the title of Vignettes of Memory.

Greville died at the Imperial Hotel in Bournemouth in 1932.

== Personal life ==
On 16 December 1863, she married the politician Algernon Greville, 2nd Baron Greville. Her first four children were:

- Hon. Ronald Henry Fulke Greville (1864–1908), who married Margaret Helen Anderson, only daughter and heiress of William McEwan MP.
- Charles Beresford Fulke Greville, 3rd Baron Greville (1871–1952), who married American heiress Olive Grace Kerr.
- Hon. Camilla Dagmar Violet Greville (1866–1938), who married Hon. Alistair George Hay, son of the Earl of Kinnoull, on 21 January 1890. They divorced in 1908.
- Hon. Lilian Veronique Greville (1869–1956), who married Cmdr. Herbert Victor Creer in 1907.

She had a fifth child, but the father was William Henry John North. He owned land and was also the Master of Foxgounds at Wroxley Hall. She and North were together for the rest of their lives, but they did not marry as Violet's husband refused to have a divorce.

She also had another child in 1874 as the result of an affair with Colonel (later Sir Henry) Hozier. The child, Edith, was fostered by a family called George in Bayswater and brought up as Edith Grant.

Her eldest son, Ronald, died childless in 1908 so her second son Charles became Baron Greville upon her estranged husband's death in 1909.

== Novels ==
- Zoe: A Girl of Genius, 1881
- Keith's Wife: A Novel, 1883.
- Creatures of Clay: A Novel, 1885.
- The Secret of Barravoe: A Tale, 1885.
- That Hated Saxon, 1893.
- The Home for Failures, 1896
