= Ronald Greville =

British politician (1864–1908)

The Honourable Ronald Greville MVO
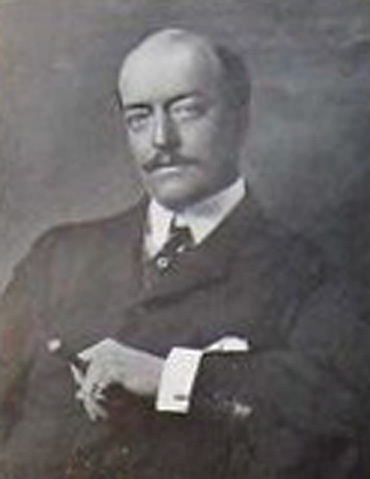

Member of Parliament for Bradford East
- In office 1896–1906
- Preceded by: Henry Byron Reed
- Succeeded by: William Priestley

Personal details
- Born: Ronald Henry Fulke Greville; 14 October 1864
- Died: 5 April 1908 (aged 43)
- Party: Conservative
- Spouse: Margaret Anderson (m. 1891)
- Relations: Charles Greville, 3rd Baron Greville (brother)
- Parents: Algernon Greville, 2nd Baron Greville; Lady Violet Graham
- Education: Rugby School

Ronald Henry Fulke Greville, MVO (14 October 1864 – 5 April 1908) was an English Conservative Party politician. He was Member of Parliament (MP) for Bradford East from 1896 to 1906.

== Early life ==
Greville was born 14 October 1864 the eldest of four children of politician Algernon Greville, 2nd Baron Greville (1841–1909) and the writer Lady Beatrice Violet Graham.

His paternal grandparents were Fulke Greville-Nugent, 1st Baron Greville and his wife, Lady Rosa Nugent (the only daughter and heir of the George Nugent, 1st Marquess of Westmeath). His maternal grandparents were James Graham, 4th Duke of Montrose and the former Hon. Caroline Agnes Horsley-Beresford (third daughter of John Horsley-Beresford, 2nd Baron Decies).

== Career ==
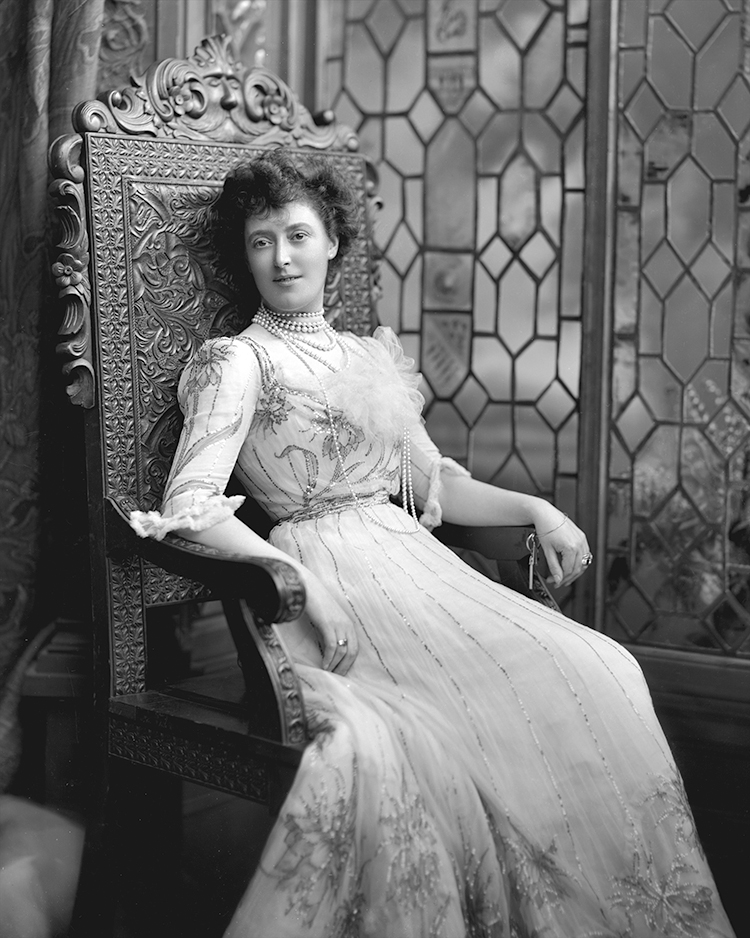
Greville's wife, Margaret Greville, in 1900

Greville was educated at Rugby School and entered the Army, at first in the 3rd (Militia) Battalion Argyll and Sutherland Highlanders and then the 1st Life Guards. Greville resigned his commission as a captain in 1896 when he was elected as a Member of Parliament.

=== Political career ===
Greville first stood for Parliament at the 1895 general election, as an unsuccessful candidate in the Liberal-held Barnsley division of the West Riding of Yorkshire. After the death of Henry Byron Reed, the Conservative MP for the Eastern division of Bradford, Greville was selected as the Conservative candidate for the resulting by-election in November 1896. He won the contest, and was re-elected in 1900, holding the seat until he retired from the House of Commons at the 1906 general election.

== Personal life ==
On 25 April 1891, he married Margaret Helen Anderson (1863–1942). Margaret was the illegitimate daughter of William McEwan, a multimillionaire brewer (later elected as an MP for Edinburgh Central) and his mistress, Helen Anderson, a cook who married McEwan after her first husband's death in 1885. After their marriage, they lived at Polesden Lacey, in Great Bookham, Surrey, a gift from his wife's father.

On 5 April 1908, when Greville was 43, he died from pneumonia following an operation, predeceasing his own father and never acceding to the peerage. As Ronald had no children, after his father's death the following December 1909, his younger brother Charles became the 3rd Baron Greville.

He was High Sheriff of Westmeath in 1899.

Parliament of the United Kingdom
Preceded by Henry Byron Reed	Member of Parliament for Bradford East; 1896 – 1906	Succeeded by William Priestley
