= Charles Greville (physician) =

English physician (1695–1769)

Charles Greville (1695–1769) was a leading physician in Gloucester, England, for 50 years. He arrived in the city around 1720 and was one of the founders of the Gloucester Infirmary. He was physician to the Infirmary 1755–1763 and physician extraordinary 1766–1769.

Greville was the son of Charles Greville, apothecary of Bristol, and the grandson of Giles Greville of Charlton Kings.

Greville's will is held at the Bristol Record Office.
