= Algernon Greville, 2nd Baron Greville =

British politician

The Right Honourable The Lord Greville
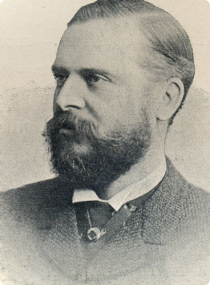

Member of Parliament for Westmeath
- In office 1865–1874 Serving with William Pollard-Urquhart (1865–1871) and Patrick James Smyth (1871–1874)
- Preceded by: Sir Richard Levinge; William Pollard-Urquhart
- Succeeded by: Patrick James Smyth; Lord Robert Montagu

Personal details
- Born: Algernon William Fulke Greville; 11 February 1841
- Died: 2 December 1909 (aged 68)
- Party: Liberal
- Spouse: Lady Violet Graham (m. 1863)
- Children: Ronald Greville; Charles Greville, 3rd Baron Greville; Violet Hay; Veronique Creer
- Parents: Fulke Greville-Nugent, 1st Baron Greville; Lady Rosa Nugent
- Relatives: George Greville-Nugent (brother); Reginald Greville-Nugent (brother)

Military service
- Rank: Captain
- Unit: 1st Regiment of Life Guards

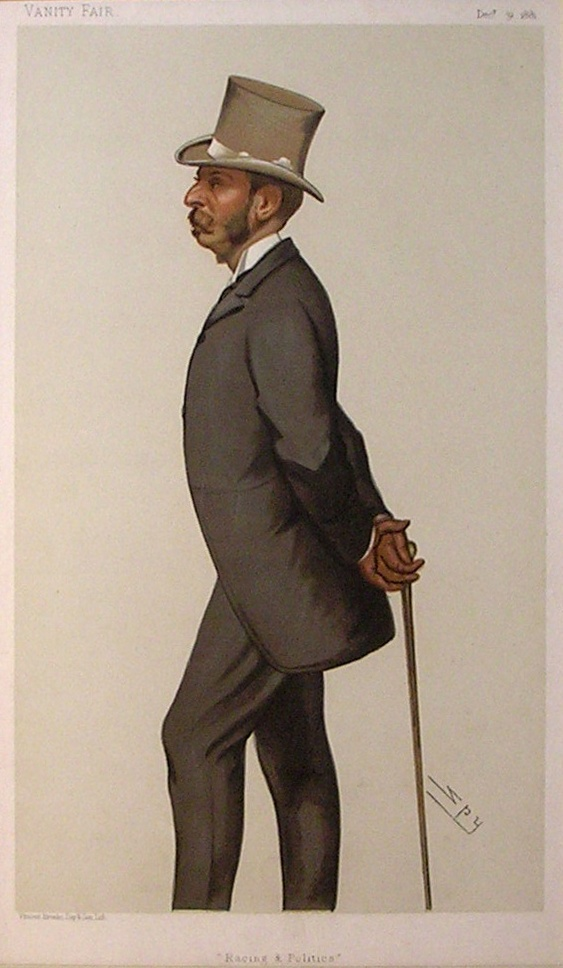
"Racing & Politics" Greville-Nugent as caricatured by Spy (Leslie Ward) in Vanity Fair, December 1881

Algernon William Fulke Greville, 2nd Baron Greville (11 February 1841 – 2 December 1909), styled Hon. Algernon Greville-Nugent from 1866 to 1883, was a British peer and Liberal politician.

== Early life ==
Algernon was the eldest of five sons of Fulke Greville-Nugent, 1st Baron Greville, and his wife, Lady Rosa Nugent. His brothers were the Hon. George Greville-Nugent MP (who married Cecil Aitcheson Hankey, a daughter of Lt Gen Henry Aitchison Hankey), the Hon. Robert Southwell Greville-Nugent (who died unmarried), Capt. the Hon. Reginald Greville-Nugent (who married Louisa Maud Buller-Yarde-Buller, sister of John Yarde-Buller, 1st Baron Churston and daughter of Sir Francis Buller-Yarde-Buller, 2nd Baronet), and the Hon. Patrick Greville-Nugent, of Clonyn Castle, the High Sheriff of Westmeath (who married Ermengarde Ogilvy. His sister was the Hon. Mildred Charlotte Greville-Nugent, who married Alexis Huchet, Marquis de la Bedoyére.

His mother was the only daughter and heiress of George Nugent, 1st Marquess of Westmeath, and his first wife, Lady Emily Cecil (second daughter of James Cecil, 1st Marquess of Salisbury). His paternal grandparents were Algernon Greville, of North Lodge in Hertford, and the former Caroline Graham (daughter of Sir Bellingham Graham, 6th Baronet).

== Career ==
In 1859, he purchased a commission as cornet and sub-lieutenant in the 1st Regiment of Life Guards. He rose to the rank of captain before retiring in 1868.

He entered the House of Commons as a Liberal in 1865 for Westmeath, which he represented until 1874. He was appointed a Groom in Waiting to Queen Victoria in 1869, resigning in 1873. From 1873 to 1874, he was a Lord of the Treasury in Gladstone's government.

=== Greville barony ===
He and his father adopted the surname of Greville-Nugent in 1866. On 15 December 1869, his father was created Baron Greville, of Clonyn in the County of Westmeath. Greville-Nugent succeeded to his father's barony in 1883 and resumed the use of the surname Greville alone.

== Personal life ==
On 16 December 1863, Greville married the writer Lady Beatrice Violet Graham. Her parents were the politician James Graham, 4th Duke of Montrose and the racehorse owner, former Hon. Caroline Agnes Horsley-Beresford (third daughter of John Horsley-Beresford, 2nd Baron Decies). Together, they were the parents of four children. His wife had a fifth child with William Henry John North. North was the 11th Baron North, he had his own land and was the Master of Foxhounds at Wroxton Abbey. He and Violet separated, and his wife continued her relationship with North for the rest of her life. Greville refused to divorce her. Their four children were:

- Hon. Ronald Henry Fulke Greville (1864–1908), who married Margaret Helen Anderson, only daughter and heiress of William McEwan MP, in 1891.
- Charles Beresford Fulke Greville, 3rd Baron Greville (1871–1952), who married American heiress Olive Grace Kerr, in 1909.
- Hon. Camilla Dagmar Violet Greville (1866–1938), who married Hon. Alistair George Hay, 4th son of the 12th Earl of Kinnoull, on 21 January 1890. They divorced in 1908.
- Hon. Lilian Veronique Greville (1869–1956), who married Cmdr. Herbert Victor Creer, in 1907.

His eldest son, Ronald, died without issue in 1908, so he was succeeded by his second son Charles upon his own death in 1909.

Parliament of the United Kingdom
| Preceded by Sir Richard Levinge; William Pollard-Urquhart | Member of Parliament for Westmeath; 1865–1874; With: William Pollard-Urquhart 1865–1871; Patrick James Smyth 1871–1874 | Succeeded by Patrick James Smyth; Lord Robert Montagu |
Peerage of the United Kingdom
| Preceded by Fulke Greville-Nugent | Baron Greville; 1883–1909 | Succeeded by Charles Greville |
