= Charles Greville, 3rd Baron Greville =

British soldier and aristocrat

The Right Honourable The Lord Greville OBE

Personal details
- Born: Charles Beresford Fulke Greville; 3 March 1871
- Died: 14 May 1952 (aged 81)
- Spouse: Olive Kerr (née Grace) (m. 1909)
- Children: Ronald Greville, 4th Baron Greville
- Parent(s): Algernon Greville, 2nd Baron Greville; Lady Beatrice Violet Graham
- Relatives: Ronald Greville (brother); Fulke Greville-Nugent, 1st Baron Greville (grandfather); James Graham, 4th Duke of Montrose (grandfather)

Charles Beresford Fulke Greville, 3rd Baron Greville OBE (3 March 1871 – 14 May 1952) was a British soldier and aristocrat.

== Early life ==
He was the second son of four children born to the writer Lady Beatrice Violet Graham and the politician Algernon Greville, 2nd Baron Greville, who married in 1863. His older brother, Ronald Greville, died in 1908. His younger sisters were Hon. Camilla Dagmar Violet Greville (wife of Hon. Alistair George Hay, son of the Earl of Kinnoull) and Hon. Lilian Veronique Greville (wife of Cmdr. Herbert Victor Creer). His father was a Liberal MP for County Westmeath who was appointed a Groom in Waiting to Queen Victoria in 1869 and, from 1873 to 1874, served as a Lord of the Treasury in Gladstone's government.

His paternal grandparents were Fulke Greville-Nugent, 1st Baron Greville and his wife, Lady Rosa Nugent (the only daughter and heir of the George Nugent, 1st Marquess of Westmeath). His maternal grandparents were James Graham, 4th Duke of Montrose and the former Hon. Caroline Agnes Horsley-Beresford (third daughter of John Horsley-Beresford, 2nd Baron Decies).

== Career ==
From 1893 to 1895, Greville served as Aide-de-camp to the Earl Cadogan, the Lord Lieutenant of Ireland, followed by Aide-de-camp to Lord Northcote, the Governor of Bombay from 1900 to 1904. From 1904 to 1908, he served as Military Secretary to the Governor-General of Australia.

Charles Greville worked for the British military from 1897, serving in the Second Matabele War. Then between 1899 and 1905, he was a Captain with the 7th Queen's Own Hussars. From 1914 to 1918 during World War I, he was a Major with the Lovat Scouts. From 1914 to 1943, he was chairman of St George's Hospital. In 1919, he was made an Officer of the Most Excellent Order of the British Empire.

As his older brother, Ronald, died without issue in 1908, Charles succeeded to his father's barony upon his death in 1909. The Greville estate aggregated to 20,000 acres across England.

== Personal life ==
In February 1909, his mother, Lady Violet (who died in 1932), wrote about the decadence of British society, blaming American brides. "'This,' she writes, 'has struck at the root of our family life and introduced a new element into the simplicity and dignity of old-fashioned households. The rich American has no traditions; no prejudices in favour of old customs, duties, or responsibilities; she is essentially irresponsible, and measures everything by one standard only--money. The result permeating through all classes has considerably increased luxury and made for independence. It has, far more than any suffragette movement, given liberty to women to do as they like; for the American regards her husband as an inferior being, made to work for her, and to lavish pleasures and gifts as a reward for her beauty and sprightliness.'" At the time, it was thought to be a criticism of the marriage of Lord Granard to Beatrice Mills.

Nine months later on 24 November 1909, Charles was married to American heiress Olive (née Grace) Kerr (1876–1959), at St Paul's Church, Knightsbridge. Olive was more than twenty minutes late to the wedding due to the breakdown of her car on the way to the ceremony. The wedding was in London, followed by a large reception at the Carlton House Terrace home of Freddie Guest and his American wife, Amy Phipps (a daughter of Henry Phipps Jr.), which the Greville's had rented for a year. The guests at the wedding included Prince Alexander of Teck. (Note: According to The New York Times, "[t]he wedding was the occasion for a family reunion on the side of the Grevilles which attracted much attention. The bridegroom's parents have not been on speaking terms for years, and Lady Greville and her daughters were not friends. All the family, however, was so pleased at the match that it brought Lord and Lady Greville and Mrs. Hay, their daughter, together into one pew in the church.") Olive, the widow of banker Henry S. Kerr (from whom she inherited $1,000,000), was a daughter of John W. Grace of Leybourne Grange in Kent (formerly the seat of the Hawley baronets) and a niece of Michael P. Grace and Mayor William Russell Grace, founder of W. R. Grace and Company. (Note: From her first marriage, she was the mother of two sons, Sir Hamilton Kerr, 1st Baronet, a Member of Parliament for Oldham and Cambridge, and Henry Grace Kerr.)

Together, Olive and Charles were the parents of:

- Ronald Charles Fulke Greville, 4th Baron Greville (1912–1987), who died unmarried.

Lord Greville died on 14 May 1952 and was succeeded in the barony by his eldest legitimate son, Ronald. Upon Ronald's death in 1987, the barony of Greville became extinct.

== Notes ==
Peerage of the United Kingdom
Preceded by Algernon Greville	Baron Greville; 1909–1952	Succeeded by Ronald Greville
