= Westmeath Rifle Militia =

Irish Militia regiment, 18th–19th centuries

Westmeath Militia Westmeath Rifles 9th (Westmeath Militia) Battalion, Rifle Brigade
- Active: 25 April 1793–1 April 1899
- Country: Ireland (1793–1800); United Kingdom (1801–99)
- Branch: Militia
- Role: Infantry
- Size: 1 Battalion
- Part of: Rifle Brigade (The Prince Consort's Own)
- Garrison/HQ: Mullingar
- Engagements: Irish Rebellion of 1798: Battle of Antrim; Battle of the Big Cross

The Westmeath Militia, later the Westmeath Rifles, was an Irish Militia regiment raised in County Westmeath in 1793. It saw action during the Irish Rebellion of 1798, when it was involved in the Battle of the Big Cross. It later became a battalion of the Rifle Brigade (The Prince Consort's Own), but was amalgamated into another battalion in 1899.

== Background ==
Although there are scattered references to town guards in 1584, no organised militia existed in Ireland before 1660. After that date, some militia forces were organised in the reign of King Charles II but it was not until 1715 that the Irish Militia came under statutory authority. During the 18th Century there were various Volunteer Associations and unofficial militia units controlled by the landowners, concerned mainly with internal security. During the War of American Independence, the threat of invasion by the Americans' allies, France and Spain, appeared to be serious. While most of the Regular Army was fighting overseas, the coasts of England and Wales were defended by the embodied Militia, but Ireland had no equivalent force. The Parliament of Ireland passed a Militia Act, but this failed to create an effective force. However it opened the way for the paramilitary Irish Volunteers to fill the gap. The Volunteers were outside the control of either the parliament or the Dublin Castle administration. When the invasion threat receded they diminished in numbers but remained a political force. On the outbreak of the French Revolutionary War In 1793, the Irish administration passed an effective Militia Act that created an official Irish Militia, while the paramilitary volunteers were essentially banned. The new Act was based on existing English precedents, with the men conscripted by ballot to fill county quotas (paid substitutes were permitted) and the officers having to meet certain property qualifications.

== Westmeath Militia ==
County Westmeath's quota was 350 men in six companies, and the regiment was raised at the county town of Mullingar. George Nugent, 7th Earl of Westmeath, was appointed Colonel on 25 April 1793, with Sir Hugh O'Reilly (created 1st Baronet in 1795), as Lieutenant-Colonel with seniority from the following day.

=== French Revolutionary War ===
The French Revolutionary and Napoleonic Wars saw the British and Irish militia embodied for a whole generation, becoming regiments of full-time professional soldiers (though restricted to service in Britain or Ireland respectively), which the regular army increasingly saw as a prime source of recruits. They served in coast defences, manned garrisons, guarded prisoners of war, and carried out internal security duties. In Ireland the latter role assumed greater importance, with frequent armed clashes between militia detachments and the self-styled 'Defenders' in the 1790s. By the end of August 1794 the Westmeath Militia was garrisoning Wexford.

In 1795 the new Lord Lieutenant of Ireland, the Earl of Camden, introduced summer camps to give the militia field training in larger formations. The largest was at Loughlinstown near Dublin. This opened on 1 June and the Westmeath Militia was one of the first regiments to join, under the command of its colonel. The Earl of Westmeath had studied tactics as a member of the Volunteers, and he drilled his regiment hard. He personally read the Articles of War to his men after Sunday services, stressing the penalties for 'profane cursing and swearing'. But he also took care of his men: finding the price of provisions to be high, he bought good quality sheep and the mutton was sold to the men at 3 1/2d a pound, instead of the market price of 6d a pound. As an early arrival, the regiment was the first to get huts constructed in its section of the lines by Loughlinstown Groves. The huts meant that the camp could be occupied throughout the year.

Anxiety about a possible French invasion grew during the autumn of 1796 and preparations were made for field operations. A large French expeditionary force appeared in Bantry Bay on 21 December and troops from all over Ireland were marched towards the threatened area: the Westmeath was sent from Limerick. However, the French fleet was scattered by winter storms, several ships being wrecked, and none of the French troops succeeded in landing; there was no sign of a rising by the United Irishmen. The invasion was called off on 29 December, and the troop concentration was dispersed in early 1797.

Early in 1797 the light companies of the militia were detached to join composite battalions drawn from several militia regiments. The Westmeath contingent was attached to 2nd Light Battalion, stationed at Bandon. The militia regiments were each issued with two light six-pounder 'battalion guns', with the gun detachments trained by the Royal Artillery. When the militiamen of 1793 reached the end of their four-year enlistment in 1797, most of the Irish regiments were able to maintain their numbers through re-enlistments (for a bounty). The Westmeath Militia was augmented in July 1797 and its establishment was raised to 460 all ranks. However, all the parishes in Westmeath had to ballot to raise the additional men, and this led to considerable disturbances: a mob disrupted the balloting at Five Mile House. Here the magistrate had assembled a group of his neighbours, who opened fire on the stone-throwing rioters, killing nine and wounding many more. Order was restored before the military arrived, after which the balloting was carried out and the Westmeath Militia got their additional men.

=== Irish Rebellion ===
The Irish Rebellion of 1798 broke out in May, and there were scattered engagements in different parts of the country. The 2nd Light Battalion (including the Light Company of the Wicklows) was present at the Battle of Antrim on 7 June when a small garrison held off a large number of rebels, who were then dispersed by the arrival of reinforcements. The insurrection in County Antrim was over by 9 June.

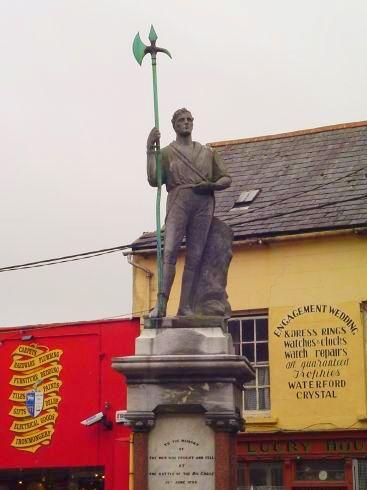
Modern monument at Clonakilty to Tadhg an Asna.

Meanwhile, the main body of the regiment was stationed at Clonakilty in West County Cork under the command of Lt-Col Sir Hugh O'Reilly. The regiment, 220 strong with its two 6-pounders, was ordered to march to Bandon, but approaching Ballynascarty on 19 June it was attacked at a crossroads by a body of 3–400 rebels, mainly armed with pikes, coming down the hillside on the left of the column. The militia hurriedly formed up and drove them off with musket fire just in time. O'Reilly had to restrain his men from pursuit, because he could see that the rebels had retired up the hill, and were being reinforced by other groups. A rebel party attempted to seize the guns, but were fired upon by a 100-strong party of the Caithness Legion who had been marching to replace the Westmeath militia at Bandon, and had advanced towards the sound of the firing. Another rebel group appeared in the rear, but were dispersed by the guns with numerous casualties. The Battle of the Big Cross, as it became known, resulted in the loss of one sergeant and one private of the Westmeaths, and a reported 130 rebels killed. Legends have grown up about a rebel leader known as Tadhg an Asna who was said to have led the attack on the guns where he was killed. The rebels seem to have expected the militiamen to join them, but this did not happen. There was no other uprising in the province of Munster.

With the diminishing threat of invasion after 1799, the strength of the militia could be reduced. At the beginning of 1800 the surplus men were encouraged to volunteer for regiments of the line. In March 1800 the light battalions were reformed, the Westmeath Militia being warned to make sure that its light company comprised men who had served before. A composite corps of pioneers under the Quartermaster-General was also formed by detachments from the regiments. Each detachment comprised one subaltern, one sergeant, one corporal and 20 picked men, who received extra pay for the work. The Westmeath contingent served in the '1st Division'.

By the end of 1801 peace negotiations with the French were progressing and recruiting and re-enlistment for the Irish Militia was stopped in October. The men received the new clothing they were due on 25 December, but the Treaty of Amiens was signed in March 1802 and the regiments were disembodied over the next two months, leaving only the permanent staffs of non-commissioned officers (NCOs) and drummers under the regimental adjutant.

=== Napoleonic Wars ===
However, the Peace of Amiens was short-lived and preparations to re-embody the militia begun in November 1802. Early in 1803 the regiments were ordered to begin re-enrolling former militiamen and new volunteers as well as using the ballot. The proclamation to embody the militia was issued on 15 March and carried out on 25 March.

Anti-invasion preparations were now put in hand and the reconstituted militia regiments underwent training, although most were not considered well enough trained to go into camp during the summer of 1804. The light battalions had been reformed in September 1803 but were discontinued in 1806. Over the following years the regiments carried out garrison duties at various towns across Ireland, attended summer training camps. They also provided volunteers to transfer to the Regular Army. In 1805 the militia establishment was raised to allow for this. When the militia were augmented again in 1807, Westmeath had to hold ballots in all its parishes to obtain enough men.

An 'Interchange Act' was passed in July 1811 permitting British and Irish militia units to volunteer for service across the Irish Sea. By the end of July 34 out of 38 Irish militia regiments had volunteered for this service, including the Westmeaths. The Earl of Westmeath was with his regiment when it was stationed at Dover. The voyage back to Ireland in 1813 took 11 days, from Spithead to Queenstown.

The war ended in 1814 with the abdication of Napoleon in April. Militia recruiting was halted and the regiments could be progressively disembodied. The Earl of Westmeath died on 30 December 1814 and his son, George, 8th Earl of Westmeath (created Marquess of Westmeath in 1822), was appointed Colonel of the Westmeath Militia on 7 January 1815. He had previously been in the Coldstream Guards and had served in the Egyptian campaign.

Napoleon escaped from Elba in 1815 and the Irish Militia were called out again on 26 June as the bulk of the regular army crossed to the Continent for the short Waterloo campaign and occupation duties in its aftermath. There were some disturbances in Ireland during this period, but these had died down by February 1816 and the militia could be gradually reduced. The last regiments had been disembodied by the end of April 1816.

After Waterloo there was a long peace. Although officers continued to be commissioned into the militia and ballots might still be held, the regiments were rarely assembled for training and the permanent staffs of militia regiments were progressively reduced. Fulke Greville-Nugent, formerly 1st Life Guards, became colonel of the disembodied Westmeath Militia on 22 August 1850.

== Westmeath Rifles ==
The Militia of the United Kingdom was revived by the Militia Act 1852, enacted during a period of international tension. As before, units were raised and administered on a county basis, and filled by voluntary enlistment (although conscription by means of the Militia Ballot might be used if the counties failed to meet their quotas). Training was for 56 days on enlistment, then for 21–28 days per year, during which the men received full army pay. Under the act, Militia units could be embodied by royal proclamation for full-time home defence service in three circumstances:

1. 'Whenever a state of war exists between Her Majesty and any foreign power'.
2. 'In all cases of invasion or upon imminent danger thereof'.
3. 'In all cases of rebellion or insurrection'.

=== Crimean War ===
The outbreak of the Crimean War in 1854 and the despatch of an expeditionary force led to the militia being called out for home defence. The regiment was reformed as the Westmeath Rifles early in 1855, with six companies and regimental headquarters (HQ) at Castletowndelvin. By early March it was stationed at Athlone, moving to the Curragh outside Dublin during July. By the autumn it was at Cork, and in November it crossed to England and became part of the Portsmouth garrison. George Forbes, 7th Earl of Granard, was appointed Lieutenant-Colonel on 26 December 1855. During February 1856 the regiment moved to Chichester. The war ended with the Treaty of Paris on 30 March, and the militia were stood down at the end of May.

The militia now settled into a routine of annual training (though there was no training for the Irish Militia from 1866 to 1870 at the time of the Fenian crisis). The militia regiments now had a large cadre of permanent staff (about 30) and a number of the officers were former Regulars. Around a third of the recruits and many young officers went on to join the Regular Army. By the mid-1860s the regimental HQ of the Westmeath Rifles had returned to Mullingar. Colonel Greville took the surname Nugent-Greville in 1866 and was created Lord Greville in 1869. The Militia Reserve introduced in 1867 consisted of present and former militiamen who undertook to serve overseas in case of war.

=== Cardwell and Childers Reforms ===
Under the 'Localisation of the Forces' scheme introduced by the Cardwell Reforms of 1872, militia regiments were brigaded with their local linked regular regiments. For the Westmeath Militia this was in Sub-District No 67 (Counties of Meath, Westmeath and Longford, and King's and Queen's Counties) in Dublin District of Irish Command:

- 100th (Prince of Wales's Royal Canadian) Regiment of Foot
- 109th (Bombay Infantry) Regiment of Foot
- Royal Longford Rifles
- King's County Rifles
- Queen's County Rifles
- Westmeath Rifles
- Royal Meath Militia
- No 67 Brigade Depot was formed in April 1873 at Birr, the King's County Militia's HQ.

Although often referred to as brigades, the sub-districts were purely administrative organisations, but in a continuation of the Cardwell Reforms a mobilisation scheme began to appear in the Army List from December 1875. This assigned places in an order of battle to Militia units serving Regular units in an 'Active Army' and a 'Garrison Army'. The Westmeath Militia was assigned to the Garrison Army manning a range of small forts and posts across Ireland.

== 9th Battalion, Rifle Brigade ==
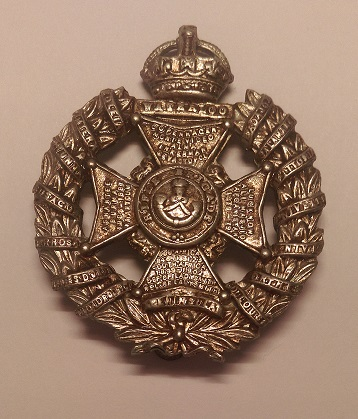
Rifle Brigade cap badge.

The Childers Reforms took Cardwell's reforms further, with the militia regiments becoming numbered battalions of their linked regiments. However, there were more Irish militia regiments than were required by the Irish regular regiments, so the Royal Longford and Westmeath Rifles were split from the Leinster Regiment (as the 100th and 109th became) and instead were assigned to the Rifle Brigade, which had no county affiliation but recruited nationally. This large regiment now consisted of:

- 1st–4th Battalions – Regular
- 5th Battalion – Queen's Own Tower Hamlets Militia at Bethnal Green, London
- 6th Battalion – Royal Longford Rifles at Longford
- 7th Battalion – King's Own Royal Tower Hamlets Light Infantry at Dalston, London
- 8th Battalion – Leitrim Rifles at Carrick-on-Shannon
- 9th Battalion – Westmeath Rifles at Mullingar

Formally, the regiment became the 9th (Westmeath Militia) Battalion, Rifle Brigade (The Prince Consort's Own) on 1 July 1881 The Rifle Brigade Depot was at Peninsula Barracks, Winchester, but the militia battalions retained their own headquarters.

== Disbandment ==
On 1 April 1899 the 9th (Westmeath Militia) Bn merged with 6th (Royal Longford Militia) Bn to form the 6th (Royal Longford and Westmeath Militia) Battalion, Rifle Brigade. Lieutenant-Col Malone of the 9th Bn became CO of the amalgamated 6th Bn, and was followed in command by two more ex-9th Bn officers, E.W. Purdon, promoted 4 July 1900, retired 16 January 1901, and Gilbert L.J.J.G. Nugent, appointed 16 February 1901.

The combined 6th Bn was embodied from 5 December 1899 to 3 December 1900 during the Second Boer War. When the militia was converted into the Special Reserve under the Haldane Reforms of 1908, the 6th Bn Rifle Brigade did not transfer and was disbanded on 31 July 1908.

== Commanders ==
=== Colonels ===
The following served as Colonel of the Regiment:

- George Nugent, 7th Earl of Westmeath, appointed 25 April 1793
- George Nugent, 1st Marquess of Westmeath, formerly Coldstream Guards, 7 January 1815
- Fulke Greville-Nugent, 1st Baron Greville, formerly 1st Life Guards, 22 August 1850; became Honorary Colonel 26 December 1875

=== Lieutenant-Colonels ===
Lieutenant-Colonels of the regiment (COs from 1852) included:

- Sir Hugh O'Reilly as Lt-Col 26 April 1793
- Sir Richard Levinge, 7th Baronet 3 January 1846
- George Forbes, 7th Earl of Granard, 26 December 1855, continued as Lt-Col commandant with 9th Rifle Brigade
- John Richard Malone, former lieutenant, 12th Lancers, promoted 25 August 1886, continued with 6th Rifle Brigade 1899.

=== Honorary Colonels ===
The following served as Honorary Colonel of the regiment:

- Fulke Greville-Nugent, 1st Baron Greville, former colonel, appointed 26 December 1875, died 1883

=== Other notable officers ===
Other notable officers included:

- Sir Percy Nugent, 1st Baronet, Captain on 29 June 1840
- Hon Charles Handcock, younger son of Richard Handcock, 2nd Baron Castlemaine, Captain by 1850

== Heritage & ceremonial ==
=== Uniforms ===
The uniform of the Westmeath Militia was a red coat with yellow facings. When it became a rifle corps in 1855 it adopted a Rifle green jacket with black facings. This was fundamentally the same as the Rifle Brigade, so only the insignia needed to change when it became a battalion of that corps.

=== Precedence ===
On the outbreak of the French Revolutionary War the English counties had drawn lots to determine the relative precedence of their militia regiments. In 1798 the new Irish militia regiments received their own table of precedence, in which County Westmeath came 6th. In 1833 King William IV drew the lots to determine an order of precedence for the whole of the United Kingdom. Those regiments raised before 1783 took the first 69 places, followed by the 60 regiments (including those in Ireland) raised for the French Revolutionary War: the Westmeath Militia took 114th place, and this remained unchanged when the list was updated in 1855.

== See also ==
- Irish Militia
- Militia (United Kingdom)
- Rifle Brigade (Prince Consort's Own)
