= Shannonvale =

Shannonvale may refer to:

== Australia ==
- Shannonvale, Queensland, a rural locality in Far North Queensland

== Canada ==
- Shannonvale, New Brunswick, a community in Canada

== Ireland ==
- Shannonvale, County Cork, a village in Ireland
- Shannonvale, County Tipperary, a townland in Tipperary near Dromineer, Ireland
