= Clonakilty Town Hall =

Municipal building in Clonakilty, County Cork, Ireland

- Halla an Bhaile Cloich na Coillte
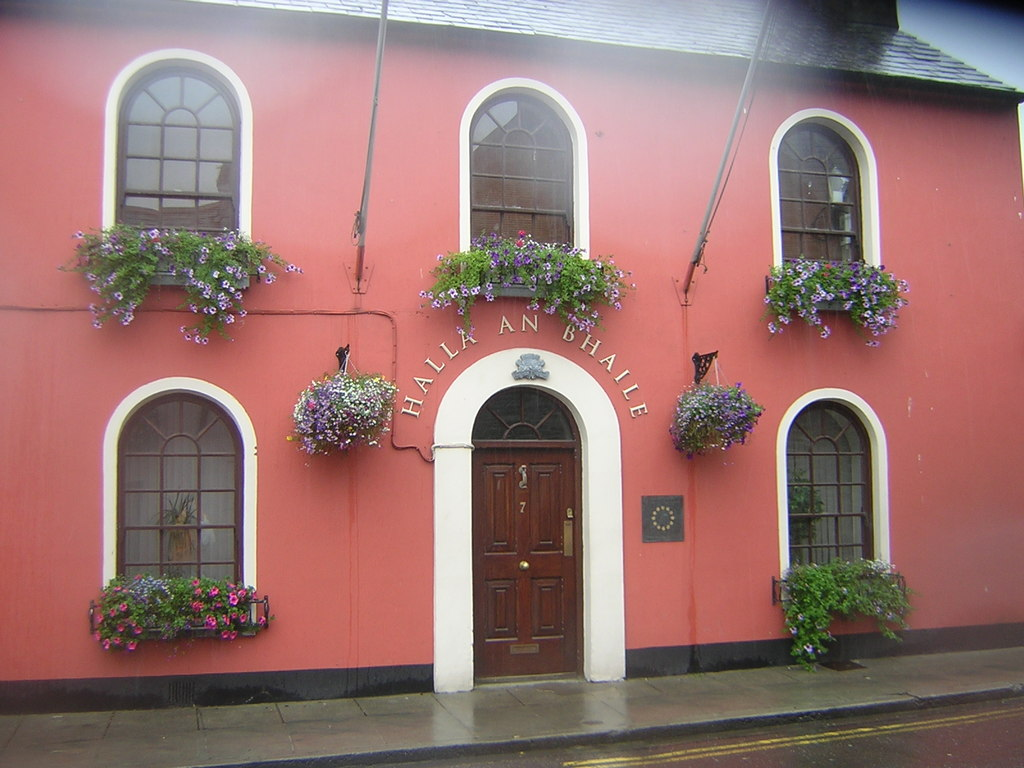
- Clonakilty Town Hall (No. 7 Kent Street)

- Clonakilty Town Hall

General information
- Architectural style: Italianate style
- Location: No. 7 Kent Street, Clonakilty, Ireland
- Coordinates: 51.6222°N 8.8895°W
- Completed: c.1819

Clonakilty Town Hall (Irish: Halla an Bhaile Cloich na Coillte) is a municipal building in Kent Street in Clonakilty, County Cork, Ireland. It is currently used by Cork County Council as the West Cork Municipal District office.

== History ==
The first municipal building in the town was a market house on the west side of Mccurtain Hill which was built in rubble masonry and completed in 1696. The bodies of six United Irishmen, killed at the Battle of the Big Cross on 17 June 1798, during the Irish Rebellion of 1798, were subsequently brought to Mccurtain Hill and laid out in front of the building as a deterrent to others. The market house was rebuilt in 1800, and it also became the home of the town commissioners in 1840. In 1899, when the town commissioners were replaced by an urban district council, the market house became the offices of the new council. The design involved a symmetrical main frontage of four bays with the central two bays slightly projected forward and surmounted by a pediment. There were four round-headed openings on the ground floor and four sash windows on the first floor, and there was an octagonal lantern behind the pediment. After the building ceased to be used for markets, the ground floor became a restaurant, and the first floor was converted for office use.

In 1953, the town council relocated to No. 5 Kent Street. This was a two-storey house on the north side of the street completed in around 1820. The building was used as an infant school managed by the Episcopal Church in the first half of the 19th century and then as a temporary Methodist church while the main Methodist church was being rebuilt in 1860. It was then used as a masonic lodge before becoming the town hall. The design involved a symmetrical main frontage of three bays facing onto the street. The central bay featured a square-headed doorway flanked by pilasters supporting a frieze and a cornice, and the building was fenestrated by sash windows. The building also served as the local library until the mid-1980s, when the adjacent mill was converted for library use. After it was no longer required for municipal use, the building served as a dental surgery but, after it was badly damaged by the flooding of the River Fealge in 2009, it was demolished in late 2019.

In 1989, the town council acquired No. 7 Kent Street. This was a two-storey house on the south side of the street completed in around 1819. The building was initially used as a girls' school, then as a teacher's house from the 1860s, and then as a private residence from the 1940s until it became the town hall. The design involved also a symmetrical main frontage of three bays facing onto the street. The central bay featured a round-headed doorway, and the building was fenestrated by round-headed windows. The building continued to be occupied by the council until 2002, when its successor body, Clonakilty Town Council, was formed there. In 2014, the council was dissolved and administration of the town was amalgamated with Cork County Council in accordance with the Local Government Reform Act 2014. The building subsequently served as the West Cork Municipal District office.
