= Leitrim Rifle Militia =

Auxiliary unit of the British Army

Leitrim Militia Leitrim Rifles 8th (Leitrim Militia) Battalion, Rifle Brigade
- Active: 1793–31 July 1889
- Country: Ireland (1793–1800); United Kingdom (1801–89)
- Branch: Militia
- Role: Infantry
- Size: 1 Battalion
- Part of: Rifle Brigade (The Prince Consort's Own)
- Garrison/HQ: Carrick-on-Shannon (Mohill 1855–74)
- Engagements: Irish Rebellion of 1798

The Leitrim Militia, later the Leitrim Rifles, was an Irish Militia regiment raised in County Leitrim in 1793. It saw action during the Irish Rebellion of 1798. It later became a battalion of the Rifle Brigade (The Prince Consort's Own), but was disbanded in 1889.

== Background ==
Although there are scattered references to town guards in 1584, no organised militia existed in Ireland before 1660. After that date, some militia forces were organised in the reign of King Charles II but it was not until 1715 that the Irish Militia came under statutory authority. During the 18th Century there were various Volunteer Associations and unofficial militia units controlled by the landowners, concerned mainly with internal security. During the War of American Independence, the threat of invasion by the Americans' allies, France and Spain, appeared to be serious. While most of the Regular Army was fighting overseas, the coasts of England and Wales were defended by the embodied Militia, but Ireland had no equivalent force. The Parliament of Ireland passed a Militia Act, but this failed to create an effective force. However it opened the way for the paramilitary Irish Volunteers to fill the gap. The Volunteers were outside the control of either the parliament or the Dublin Castle administration. When the invasion threat receded they diminished in numbers but remained a political force. On the outbreak of the French Revolutionary War In 1793, the Irish administration passed an effective Militia Act that created an official Irish Militia, while the paramilitary volunteers were essentially banned. The new Act was based on existing English precedents, with the men conscripted by ballot to fill county quotas (paid substitutes were permitted) and the officers having to meet certain property qualifications.

== Leitrim Militia ==
County Leitrim's quota was 350 men in six companies, and the regiment was raised at the county town of Carrick-on-Shannon.

=== French Revolutionary War ===
The French Revolutionary and Napoleonic Wars saw the British and Irish militia embodied for a whole generation, becoming regiments of full-time professional soldiers (though restricted to service in Britain or Ireland respectively), which the regular army increasingly saw as a prime source of recruits. They served in coast defences, manned garrisons, guarded prisoners of war, and carried out internal security duties. In Ireland the latter role assumed greater importance, with frequent armed clashes between militia detachments and the self-styled 'Defenders' in the 1790s. By the end of August 1794 the regiment was stationed in County Meath with four companies at Trim, and two at Kells.

Walter Jones and John Peyton were appointed Colonel and Lieutenant-Colonel respectively of the regiment on 17 November 1795.

Anxiety about a possible French invasion grew during the autumn of 1796 and preparations were made for field operations. A large French expeditionary force appeared in Bantry Bay on 21 December and troops from all over Ireland were marched towards the threatened area. The Leitrim Militia was sent, and by 27 December was one of several regiments on the road between Cork and Bantry. However, the French fleet was scattered by winter storms, several ships being wrecked, and none of the French troops succeeded in landing; there was no sign of a rising by the United Irishmen. The invasion was called off on 29 December, and the troop concentration was dispersed in early 1797.

In 1797 the light companies of the militia were detached to join composite battalions drawn from several militia regiments. The Leitrim contingent was attached to 2nd Light Battalion, stationed at Bandon, County Cork. The militia regiments were each issued with two light six-pounder 'battalion guns', with the gun detachments trained by the Royal Artillery. When the militiamen of 1793 reached the end of their four-year enlistment in 1797, most of the Irish regiments were able to maintain their numbers through re-enlistments (for a bounty). The County Leitrim quota was augmented to 460 men.

=== Irish Rebellion ===
The Irish Rebellion of 1798 broke out in May, and there were scattered engagements in different parts of the country. The 2nd Light Battalion (including the Light Company of the Leitrims) was present at the Battle of Antrim on 7 June when a small garrison held off a large number of rebels, who were then dispersed by the arrival of reinforcements. The insurrection in County Antrim was over by 9 June. The rest of the regiment was present at the action at Whiteheaps on 5 July. The back of the rebellion had already been broken at the Battle of Vinegar Hill in June, and although a French force belatedly landed and inflicted a defeat on the government troops at the Battle of Castlebar in August, it was soon forced to surrender and the rebellion was stamped out.

With the diminishing threat of invasion after 1799, the strength of the militia could be reduced. At the beginning of 1800 the surplus men were encouraged to volunteer for regiments of the line. In March 1800 the light battalions were reformed, the Leitrim Militia being warned to make sure that its light company comprised men who had served before.

By the end of 1801 peace negotiations with the French were progressing, and recruiting and re-enlistment for the Irish Militia was stopped in October. The men received the new clothing they were due on 25 December, but the Treaty of Amiens was signed in March 1802 and the regiments were disembodied over the next two months, leaving only the permanent staffs of non-commissioned officers (NCOs) and drummers under the regimental adjutant.

=== Napoleonic Wars ===
However, the Peace of Amiens was short-lived and preparations to re-embody the militia begun in November 1802. Early in 1803 the regiments were ordered to begin re-enrolling former militiamen and new volunteers as well as using the ballot. The proclamation to embody the militia was issued on 15 March and carried out on 25 March.

Anti-invasion preparations were now put in hand and the reconstituted militia regiments underwent training. Although most of them were not considered well enough trained to go into camp during the summer of 1804, a few regiments did, including the Leitrim, which was part of a large encampment at the Curragh, outside Dublin. The light battalions had been reformed in September 1803 but were discontinued in 1806. Over the following years the regiments carried out garrison duties at various towns across Ireland. They also provided volunteers to transfer to the Regular Army. In 1805 the militia establishment was raised to allow for this. When the militia were augmented again in 1807, Leitrim was able to raise the additional men without recourse to the ballot.

An 'Interchange Act' was passed in July 1811 permitting British and Irish militia units to volunteer for service across the Irish Sea. By the end of July 34 out of 38 Irish militia regiments had volunteered for this service, including the Leitrim. In 1812 the regiment was quartered at Bristol, suffering some abuse from the inhabitants.

The war ended in 1814 with the abdication of Napoleon in April. Militia recruiting was halted and the regiments could be progressively disembodied.

Napoleon escaped from Elba in 1815 and the Irish Militia were called out again on 26 June as the bulk of the regular army crossed to the Continent for the short Waterloo campaign and occupation duties in its aftermath. There were some disturbances in Ireland during this period, but these had died down by February 1816 and the militia could be gradually reduced. The last regiments had been disembodied by the end of April 1816.

After Waterloo there was a long peace. Although ballots might still be held, the regiments were rarely assembled for training and the permanent staffs were progressively reduced. Officers continued to be commissioned into the disembodied militia: Henry Theophilus Clements became Lt-Col of the Leitrim Militia on 11 November 1842 and Brevet Lt-Col Viscount Clements (later 3rd Earl of Leitrim), formerly a Captain in the 43rd Foot, was appointed Colonel on 2 February 1843

== Leitrim Rifles ==
The Militia of the United Kingdom was revived by the Militia Act 1852, enacted during a period of international tension. As before, units were raised and administered on a county basis, and filled by voluntary enlistment (although conscription by means of the Militia Ballot might be used if the counties failed to meet their quotas). Training was for 56 days on enlistment, then for 21–28 days per year, during which the men received full army pay. Under the act, Militia units could be embodied by royal proclamation for full-time home defence service in three circumstances:

1. 'Whenever a state of war exists between Her Majesty and any foreign power'.
2. 'In all cases of invasion or upon imminent danger thereof'.
3. 'In all cases of rebellion or insurrection'.

=== Crimean War ===
The outbreak of the Crimean War in 1854 and the despatch of an expeditionary force led to the militia being called out for home defence. The regiment was reformed as the Leitrim Rifles early in 1855, with six companies and regimental headquarters (HQ) at Mohill. Although many younger officers were appointed to the reformed militia, the Earl of Leitrim and Lt-Col Clements retained their positions.

By early March 1855 the regiment was embodied at Mohill, moving to Longford during June, and then to Cork in November. It remained there until the war ended with the Treaty of Paris on 30 March 1856, and the militia were stood down at the end of May.

The Hon William Francis Forbes, younger brother of George Forbes, 7th Earl of Granard, who was Lt-Col Commandant of the Westmeath Rifle Militia, was appointed Major in the Leitrim Rifles in 1859. He was a former Lieutenant & Captain in the Grenadier Guards. In 1871 he was promoted to Honorary Colonel of the Leitrim Rifles, over the head of Lt-Col Clements, who remained commandant, with the personal honorary rank of colonel.

The militia now settled into a routine of annual training (though there was no training for the Irish Militia from 1866 to 1870 at the time of the Fenian crisis). The militia regiments now had a large cadre of permanent staff (about 30) and a number of the officers were former Regulars. Around a third of the recruits and many young officers went on to join the Regular Army. The Militia Reserve introduced in 1867 consisted of present and former militiamen who undertook to serve overseas in case of war.

=== Cardwell Reforms ===
Under the 'Localisation of the Forces' scheme introduced by the Cardwell Reforms of 1872, militia regiments were brigaded with their local linked regular regiments. For the Leitrim Militia this was in Sub-District No 68 (Counties of Leitrim, Sligo, Roscommon, Mayo, and Galway) in Dublin District of Irish Command:

- 87th (Royal Irish Fusiliers) Regiment of Foot
- 88th Regiment of Foot (Connaught Rangers)
- South Mayo Rifles
- Galway Militia
- Roscommon Militia
- Leitrim Rifles
- North Mayo Fusiliers
- Sligo Rifles (Duke of Connaught's Own) – converted to artillery 1877
- No 68 Brigade Depot was formed in April 1873 at Galway.

Although often referred to as brigades, the sub-districts were purely administrative organisations, but in a continuation of the Cardwell Reforms a mobilisation scheme began to appear in the Army List from December 1875. This assigned places in an order of battle to Militia units serving Regular units in an 'Active Army' and a 'Garrison Army'. The Leitrim Rifles was assigned to the Garrison Army manning a range of small forts and posts across Ireland. In 1874 Regimental HQ moved back to Carrick-on-Shannon.

== 8th Battalion, Rifle Brigade ==
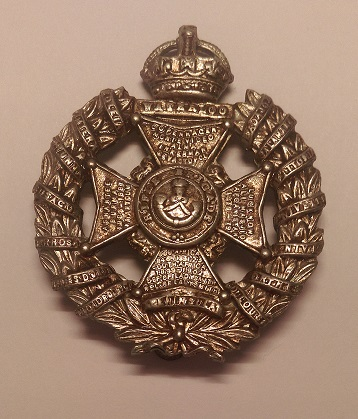
Rifle Brigade cap badge.

The Childers Reforms took Cardwell's reforms further, with the militia regiments becoming numbered battalions of their linked regiments. However, there were more Irish militia regiments than were required by the Irish regular regiments, so the Leitrim Rifles were split from the Connaught Rangers' group based at Galway and instead were assigned to the Rifle Brigade, which had no county affiliation but recruited nationally. This large regiment now consisted of:

- 1st–4th Battalions – Regular
- 5th Battalion – Queen's Own Tower Hamlets Militia at Bethnal Green, London
- 6th Battalion – Royal Longford Rifles at Longford
- 7th Battalion – King's Own Royal Tower Hamlets Light Infantry at Dalston, London
- 8th Battalion – Leitrim Rifles at Carrick-on-Shannon
- 9th Battalion – Westmeath Rifles at Mullingar

Formally, the regiment became the 8th (Leitrim Militia) Battalion, Rifle Brigade (The Prince Consort's Own) on 1 July 1881. The Rifle Brigade Depot was at Peninsula Barracks, Winchester, but the militia battalions retained their own headquarters.

However, by the late 1880s the 8th Battalion was under threat. On 11 December 1888, Luke Hayden, Member of Parliament for South Leitrim, asked Edward Stanhope, the Secretary of State for War, if there was any intention of training the '8th Battalion Connaught Rangers (Leitrim Militia)' (sic) anywhere other than Carrick-on-Shannon in 1889. Stanhope corrected the MP over the title of the battalion and stated that no arrangements had been made for its training in 1889. In fact the battalion was disbanded on 31 July 1889.

== Commanders ==
=== Colonels ===
The following served as Colonel of the Regiment:

- Walter Jones, 17 November 1795
- H.J. Clements in 1840
- William Clements, 3rd Earl of Leitrim, 2 February 1843

=== Lieutenant-Colonels ===
Lieutenant-Colonels of the regiment (Commandants from 1855) included:

- John Peyton, 17 November 1795
- John James Cullen, promoted 1806, died 1842
- Henry Theophilus Clements, appointed 11 November 1842
- James F. Rynd, promoted 13 February 1878

=== Honorary Colonels ===
The following served as Honorary Colonel of the regiment:

- Hon William Francis Forbes, promoted from major 15 April 1871

== Heritage and ceremonial ==
=== Uniforms ===
The uniform of the Leitrim Militia was a red coat with yellow facings. When it became a rifle corps in 1855 it adopted a Rifle green jacket with black facings. This was fundamentally the same as the Rifle Brigade, so only the insignia needed to change when it became a battalion of that corps.

=== Precedence ===
On the outbreak of the French Revolutionary War the English counties had drawn lots to determine the relative precedence of their militia regiments. In 1798 the new Irish militia regiments received their own table of precedence, in which County Leitrim came 10th. In 1833 King William IV drew the lots to determine an order of precedence for the whole of the United Kingdom. Those regiments raised before 1783 took the first 69 places, followed by the 60 regiments (including those in Ireland) raised for the French Revolutionary War: the Leitrim Militia took 111th place, and this remained unchanged when the list was updated in 1855.

== See also ==
- Irish Militia
- Militia (United Kingdom)
- Rifle Brigade (Prince Consort's Own)
