= Battle of the Big Cross =

- Part of the Irish Rebellion of 1798
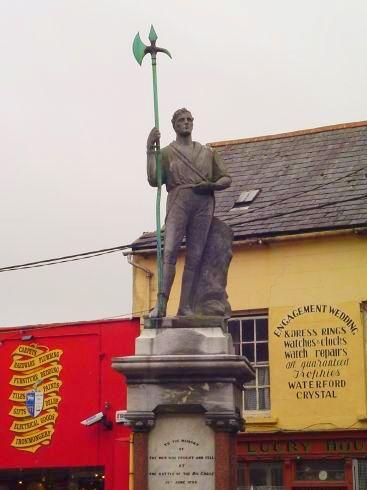
- Monument to United Irish commander Tadhg an Astna O'Donovan in Clonakilty
Date	19 June 1798
Location	County Cork, Ireland
Result	British victory

Belligerents
Great Britain	United Irishmen

Commanders and leaders
Sir Hugh O'Reilly	Tadhg an Astna O'Donovan †

Strength
320	Unknown

Casualties and losses
2 killed	50–100

The Battle of the Big Cross was a military engagement of the Irish Rebellion of 1798 between a force of United Irishmen rebels and a column of government troops. It was fought on 19 June 1798 on a spot on the Shannonvale-Ballinascarty road known locally as the "Big Cross", approximately four miles east of Clonakilty in West Cork. It was the only battle fought in the rebellion in County Cork.

== Background ==
The attempted landing of a French invasion fleet in Bantry Bay in late 1796 surprised the Dublin Castle administration. In response, government forces, including regular troops, militia, yeomanry and fencibles were garrisoned all over West Cork. In early 1798, Major-General Sir John Moore was given command over a force of 3,000 soldiers in West Cork. A proclamation was issued by the authorities, stipulating that all weaponry be handed over to either government troops or local magistrates by 2 May under an amnesty.

During the searches for weapons in Cork County in May, Moore issued orders for his men to "treat the people with as much harshness as possible, as far as words and manners went, and to supply themselves with whatever provisions were necessary to enable them to live well." According to historian Thomas Pakenham, as Moore was present during these searches, he prevented "great abuses" from taking place. However, as Moore himself noted, "The terror was great. The moment a red coat appeared everyone fled." The official disarming of West Cork was completed by 23 May. Moore and his troops had found 800 pikes and 3,400 firearms, and large numbers of suspected United Irishmen were arrested. When the United Irishmen in Leinster, especially Wexford, rose in rebellion in late May and early June 1798, West Cork remained very quiet. Many of the government troops in West Cork were in Irish Catholics and were recruited from among the peasantry. There is strong evidence that government troops may have had United Irishmen members or sympathizers among their ranks.

== Battle ==
A detachment of 220 Westmeath Militia was stationed in Clonakilty under Lieutenant-Colonel Sir Hugh O'Reilly. On the afternoon of the 18th, O'Reilly received orders that his troops were to transfer to Bandon, about 15 miles east of Clonakilty. Early on the morning of 19 June, the Westmeath Militia, equipped with two artillery pieces, were marching in acolumn when they were confronted by a force of 300-400 United Irishmen rebels, lightly armed and consisting mostly of local peasantry, at a local crossroads known as the "Big Cross" under the command of a man named Tadhg an Astna O'Donovan. Much of what we know of the engagement comes from local folklore or from the pen of Sir Hugh O'Donovan who is said to have appealed to the mostly Irish troops and United Irishmen among the Westmeath militia's ranks to join his party. He was instead met with gunfire, though the Westmeath militia's commanding officer Sir Hugh O'Reilly denied this happened.

In the short engagement that followed, the United Irishmen who had few firearms were routed. The United Irishmen were also attacked by the 100 men of the Caithness Legion, a Scottish fencible regiment relieving the Westmeath militia in Clonakilty. Estimates of rebel casualties have varied from 50 to 100 while O'Reilly reported the loss of only one sergeant and one private The reel casualties included O'Donovan, possibly shot in the back during an almost successful assault on O'Reilly's troops, who suffered few casualties after the battle. Yeomanry troops dragged the bodies of the dead United Irishmen rebels into Clonakilty town and left them in front of the town's market house for several days. They were later dumped in a local strand at a spot now known as the Croppy Hole, with their relatives recovering them afterwards. Public notices were placed, written in both Irish and English, urging the local people to yield up to justice their leaders and instigators, surrender all their illegal weapons, return to their habitations and resume their industrious employments.

== In popular culture ==
One of the participants in the battle, Padraig Ó Scolaidhe from Ardfield, wrote a song, "Cath Bhéal an Mhuighe Shalaigh", in the Irish language which would have been the vernacular of Ardfield at the time. A statue of the United Irish leader. Tadhg an Astna. was erected in Clonakilty town centre in 1905.
