= Inchydoney =

Island in Ireland

Native name: Inse Duine
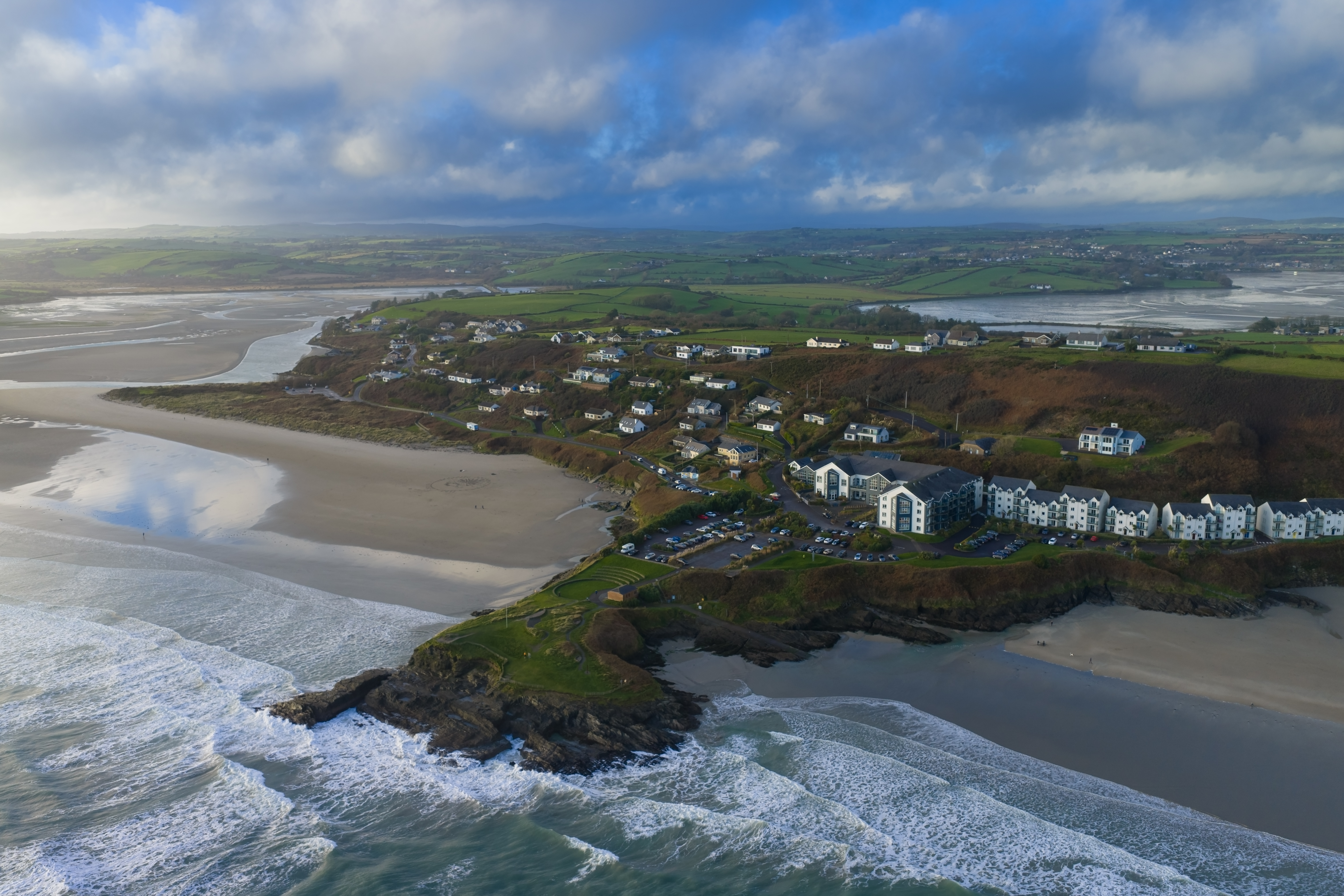
- Inchydoney Island Beach

- Location within island of Ireland

Geography
- Location: Clonakilty Harbour
- Coordinates: 51°36′07″N 8°52′34″W

Administration
- Ireland
- County: County Cork

Demographics
- Ethnic groups: Irish

Inchydoney or Inchydoney Island (from Irish Inse Duine) (sometimes misspelled Inchadoney) is a small island off West Cork, Ireland, connected to the mainland by two causeways. The nearest town is Clonakilty. It has a Blue Flag beach.

It is a tourist destination with two beaches, one either side of the Virgin Mary headland. In summer there is a lifeguard station on the headland for three months.

== History ==
The island was granted by Queen Elizabeth I to the Church of Ireland Bishop of Ross in 1584. During the Irish Confederate Wars, when a Protestant force led by Lord Forbes retook the town of Clonakilty from Catholic rebels in 1642, several hundred rebels fled towards the island to take refuge, but were caught and drowned in the rising tide before reaching Inchydoney.

== Gallery ==
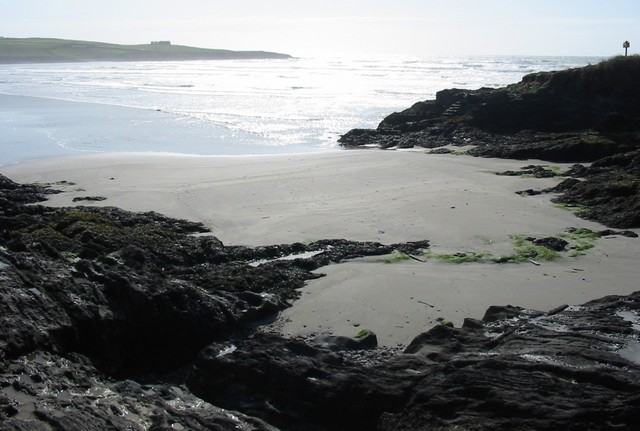
Rocky cove east of Inchdoney headland

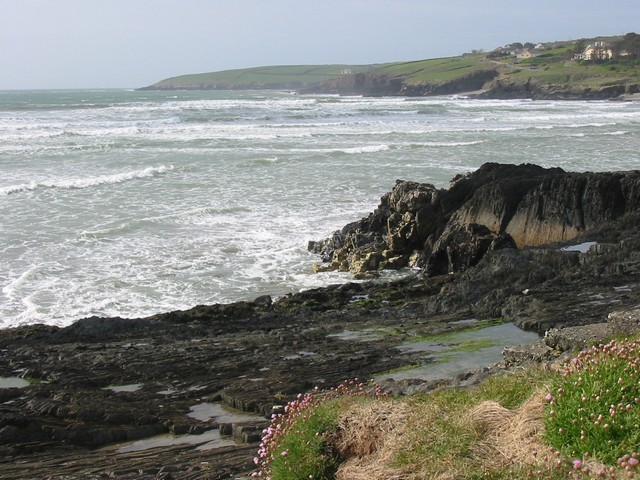
Outcrops to west of Inchdoney

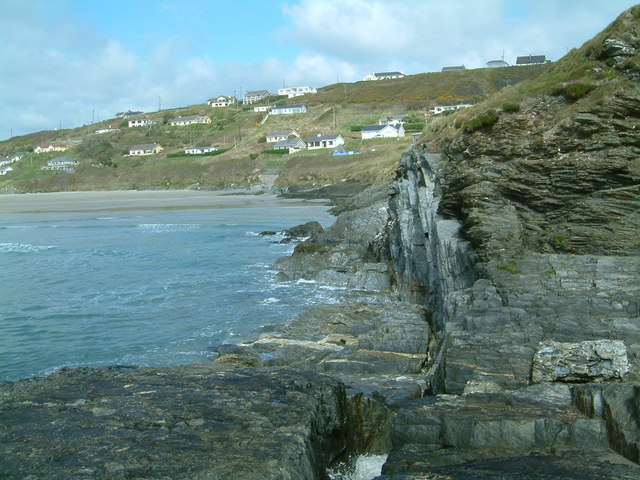
Inchydoney beach
