= Clonakilty =

Town in County Cork, Ireland

Clonakilty Irish: Cloich na Coillte
- Town
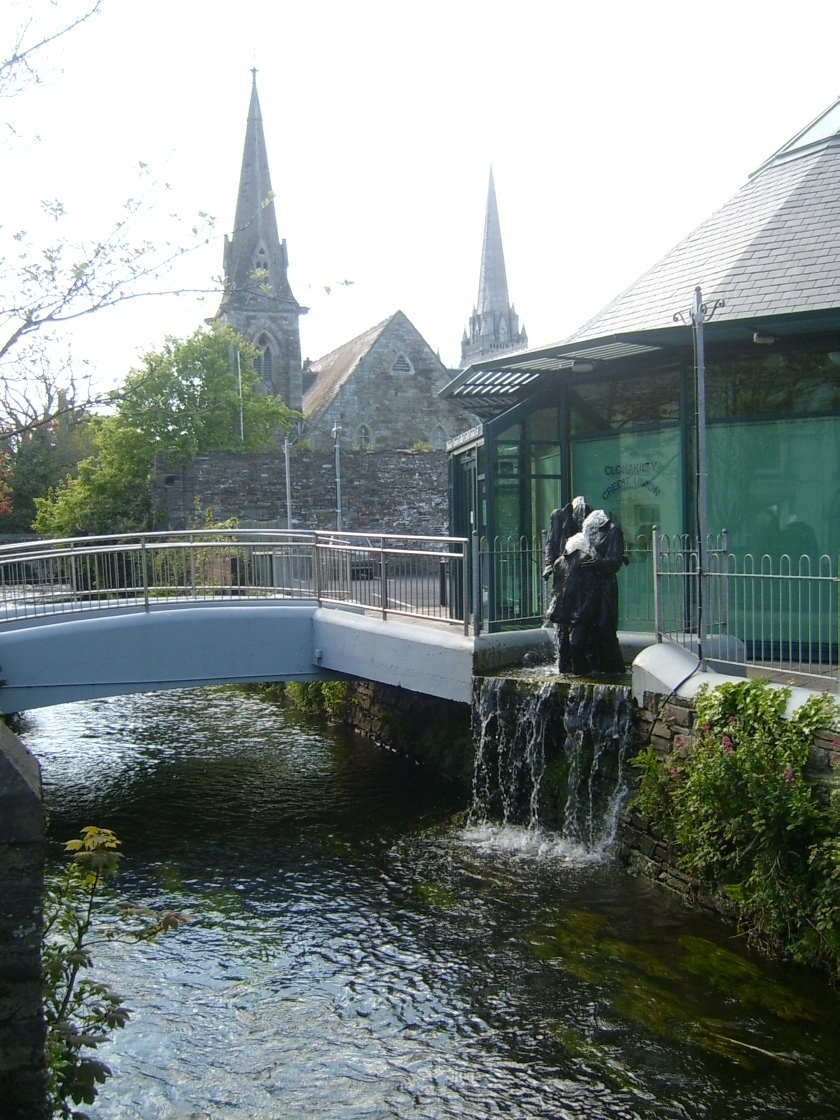
- The Feagle River passes through Clonakilty

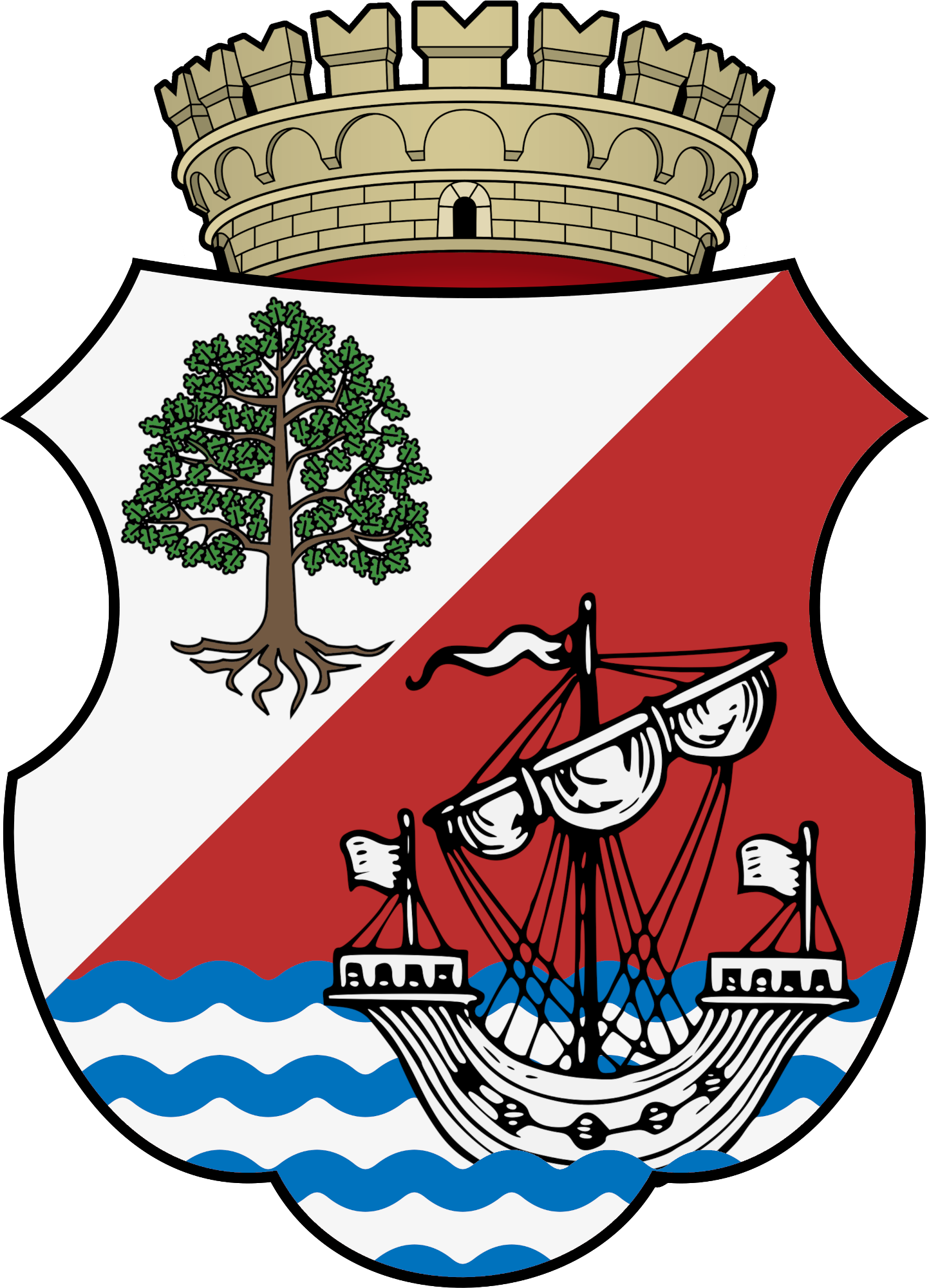
- Coat of arms

- Location in Ireland
- Coordinates: 51°37′19″N 8°53′11″W
- Country: Ireland
- Province: Munster
- County: County Cork

Area
  - Total: 3.433 km^{2} (1.325 sq mi)

Population (2022)
  - Total: 5,112
  - Density: 1,489/km^{2} (3,857/sq mi)
- Time zone: UTC±0 (WET)
  - Summer (DST): UTC+1 (IST)
- Eircode routing key: P85
- Telephone area code: +353(0)23
- Irish Grid Reference: W381417
- Website: clonakilty.ie

Clonakilty (/ˈklɔːnæˌkɪltiː/; Irish: Cloich na Coillte, meaning 'stone (castle) of the woods'), sometimes shortened to Clon, is a town in County Cork, Ireland. The town is at the head of the tidal Clonakilty Bay. The rural hinterland is used mainly for dairy farming. The town's population was 5,112 at the 2022 census. The town is a tourism hub in West Cork, and was recognised as the "Best Town in Europe" in 2017, and "Best Place of the Year" in 2017 by the Royal Institute of the Architects of Ireland. Clonakilty is in the Dáil constituency of Cork South-West, which has three seats. Clonakilty became Ireland's first Autism-friendly town in 2018.

== History ==
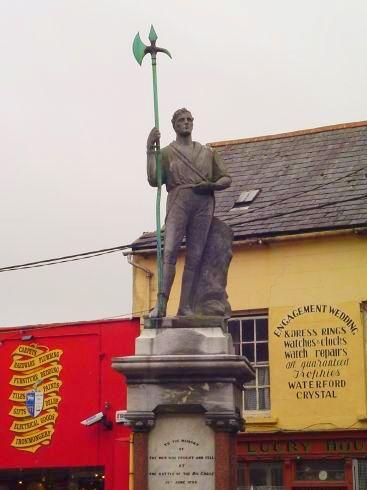
A statue in Clonakilty commemorating the Battle of the Big Cross

The Clonakilty area has a number of ancient and pre-Celtic sites, including Lios na gCon ringfort. Norman settlers built castles around Clonakilty, and a number of Norman surnames survive in the West Cork area to the present day. In 1292, Thomas De Roach received a charter to hold a market every Monday at Kilgarriffe (then called Kyle Cofthy or Cowhig's Wood), close to where the present town now stands. In the 14th century, a ten-mile strip of fallow woodland called Tuath na gCoillte (the land of the woods) divided the barony of Ibane (Ardfield) and Barryroe and reached the sea at Clonakilty Bay. Here a castle called Coyltes Castell was recorded in a 1378 plea roll. This was subsequently referred to as Cloghnykyltye, one of the many phonetic spellings for Cloch na gCoillte (meaning the castle of the woods, from cloch, the Irish for stone or stone building, and coillte meaning woods).

The lands around Clonakilty were owned by Richard Boyle, 1st Earl of Cork, and it was Lord Cork ('the Great Earl') who obtained its charter from James I in 1613, with the right to return members to the Irish House of Commons. The borough of Clonakilty returned two members from 1613 to 1801; it was disfranchised when the Act of Union came into force in January 1801. It also had a part-time judge, the Recorder of Clonakilty, who held a weekly court of Petty session. The estate lands at Clonakilty were later purchased by the Earls of Shannon, another branch of the Boyle dynasty. They remained the main landlords of the town from the eighteenth century until the early twentieth century.

During the Irish Rebellion of 1641, Protestant settlers in Clonakilty fled to Bandon, and much of Clonakilty was burned by Catholic rebels. On October 1642, a Protestant force led by the then Lord Forbes reoccupied the town. Forbes left two companies from the Lord Forbes' Regiment and one company from the Bandon Foot to garrison Clonakilty before leaving the town to relieve Rathbarry Castle, which was under siege by rebel forces. However, almost immediately after Lord Forbes left Clonakilty, a large force of Catholic rebels attacked the town; the two Scottish companies refused to retreat and were killed to a man, while the Irish company fought their way out of the town to an abandoned ringfort near Rosscarbery, where they were relieved by Lord Forbes who had returned from Rathbarry. The reunified force returned to Clonakilty and drove out the rebels, who fled towards the island of Inchydoney, where roughly six hundred of them drowned at high tide. Lord Forbes' men returned to the town and freed a large number of men, women and children imprisoned in Clonakilty's market house.

The town was also the site of a battle in 1691 during the Williamite War in Ireland. During the Irish Rebellion of 1798, Shannonvale near Clonakilty was the site of the Battle of the Big Cross. It was described as "the only place in all Munster where a blow of some sort had been struck during the Rising of '98". There is a commemorative statue celebrating the Battle of the Big Cross in Asna Square in the centre of Clonakilty.

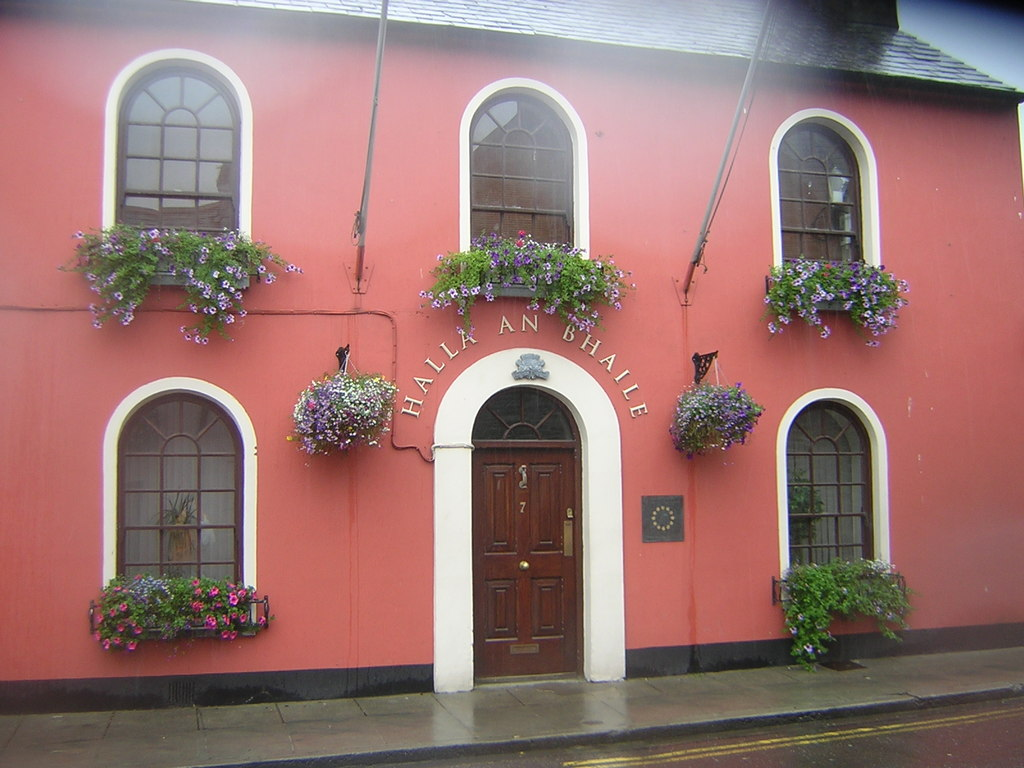
Clonakilty Town Hall

Clonakilty Town Hall was completed as a school in around 1819.

A monument to Michael Collins

Michael Collins, who was the Director of Intelligence for the Irish Republican Army (IRA) during the Irish War of Independence, lived in Clonakilty and attended the local boys' national school. Collins later served as Chairman of the Provisional Government of Ireland and was instrumental in the founding of the Irish Free State. Collins was killed in an ambush by the Anti-Treaty IRA during the Irish Civil War. He gave several orations from O'Donovan's Hotel on the Main Street of Clonakilty. On Emmet Square, where Collins lived for a period, is a statue of him, erected and dedicated in 2002, and a museum, opened in 2016.

In April 1943, an American Boeing B-17 Flying Fortress was travelling to England when it was forced to land at a marsh just outside Clonakilty. The crew (who were uninjured) thought they had been flying over German-occupied Norway. Kennedy Gardens at Emmet Square (formerly Shannon Square) in the centre of town is named after John F. Kennedy. In June 2012, Clonakilty was damaged by flooding. Clonakilty was founded on 5 May 1613, and on 5 May 2013, President Michael D. Higgins and his wife visited the town to commemorate 400 years since it obtained its original charter.

== Churches ==
Kilgarriffe Church, a Church of Ireland church, was built in 1818 to replace an older building which dated from 1613.

The Church of the Immaculate Conception, a large Catholic church, was designed by George Ashlin and built in 1880 in the Early French Gothic style.

The old Presbyterian Church was built in 1861 and taken over and used since 1924 as a local Post Office. The local Methodist church is located in the town and became the first church in Ireland to win two Eco Congregation Ireland awards.

== Transport ==
The nearest airport to the town is Cork Airport, and Bus Éireann provides coach links from Clonakilty to Cork and Skibbereen. During the summer months, there is a bus link to Killarney via the N71 road through Skibbereen, Bantry, Glengarriff and Kenmare.

Clonakilty was one of the destinations on the West Cork Railway, an Irish mainline railway from Cork city to various parts of West Cork, which shut down in 1961. Clonakilty railway station opened on 28 August 1886, but finally closed on 1 April 1961.

Clonakilty has a bypass road on the N71, to the south of the town, which routes traffic to Cork, Kinsale, Bandon, Skibbereen and Dunmanway via the R599, just west of the town, or vice versa to the R588 via Enniskean and the town centre.

== Culture and music ==
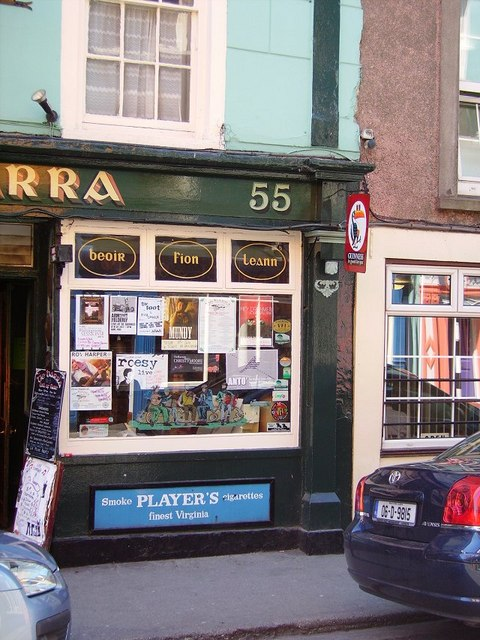
De Barra's

Clonakilty's bars host live music nights throughout the year, and De Barra's Folk Club, Shanley's Music Bar, and O'Donovans and are among the town's music venues. De Barra's Folk Club has featured acts like Christy Moore, Sharon Shannon, Roy Harper, John Spillane and Frances Black.

A number of notable musicians live in the area. For example, Noel Redding made Clonakilty his home, as has singer-songwriter Roy Harper. English novelist David Mitchell also calls Clonakilty home.

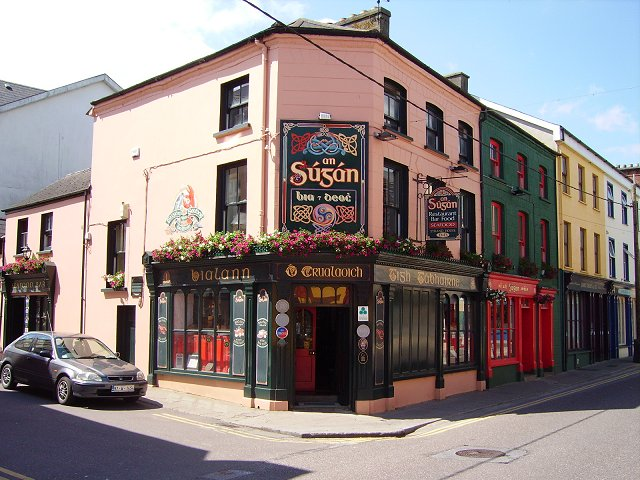
An Súgán

The town also hosts several festivals every year, including the Clonakilty International Guitar Festival in mid-September, the Motion Festival and the Waterfront Festival in August.

== Awards ==
The town won the Irish Tidy Towns Competition in 1999 and was also named 'Ireland's Tidiest Small Town' in 2012, 2017 and 2022. It received gold medals in the competition in the years 1997-2000, 2002, 2004-2019 and 2021-2025. In 2003, Clonakilty became Ireland's first-ever Fairtrade Town. In 2007, it was awarded the status of 'European Destination of Excellence' by the European Commission at a ceremony in Portugal and is Ireland's first recipient of this title.

== Demographics ==
Historical population
Year	Pop.	±%
1821	4,033	—
1831	3,807	−5.6%
1841	3,993	+4.9%
1851	3,297	−17.4%
1861	3,108	−5.7%
1871	3,568	+14.8%
1881	3,676	+3.0%
1891	3,221	−12.4%
1901	3,098	−3.8%
1911	2,961	−4.4%
1926	2,770	−6.5%
1936	2,961	+6.9%
1946	2,825	−4.6%
1951	2,742	−2.9%
1956	2,517	−8.2%
1961	2,417	−4.0%
1966	2,422	+0.2%
1971	2,430	+0.3%
1981	2,698	+11.0%
1986	2,786	+3.3%
1991	2,812	+0.9%
1996	2,970	+5.6%
2002	3,698	+24.5%
2006	4,154	+12.3%
2011	4,721	+13.6%
2016	4,592	−2.7%
2022	5,112	+11.3%

At the 2011 census, ethnically Clonakilty was 80% white Irish, 14% "other white", 1.5% black, 1.5% Asian, and 2% other or not stated. In terms of religion, the 2011 census captured a population that was 80.5% Catholic, 10% other stated religions, 8.5% with no religion, and 0.5% not stated.

As of the 2022 census, the town of Clonakilty had a usual resident population of 4,994. Of these, 71.9% were White Irish, 0.6% were White Irish Travellers, 15.7% were Other White ethnicities, 2.0% were Black or Black Irish, 4.0% were Asian or Asian Irish, 2.0% were of other ethnicities, and 3.8% did not state their ethnicity. 72.6% of the usual residents were born in the Republic of Ireland, 6.9% in the United Kingdom, 5.2% in Poland, 0.9% in India, 6.0% in other EU countries excluding Ireland and Poland, and 8.4% in the rest of the world.

== Food ==
The town is known for its black pudding. Clonakilty black pudding originated in Edward Twomey's butcher shop in Pearse Street. The secret spice recipe has been handed down through the generations since the 1880s, and is still known only to the Twomey family who continue to manufacture the pudding at the Clonakilty Food Company.

== Tourism ==
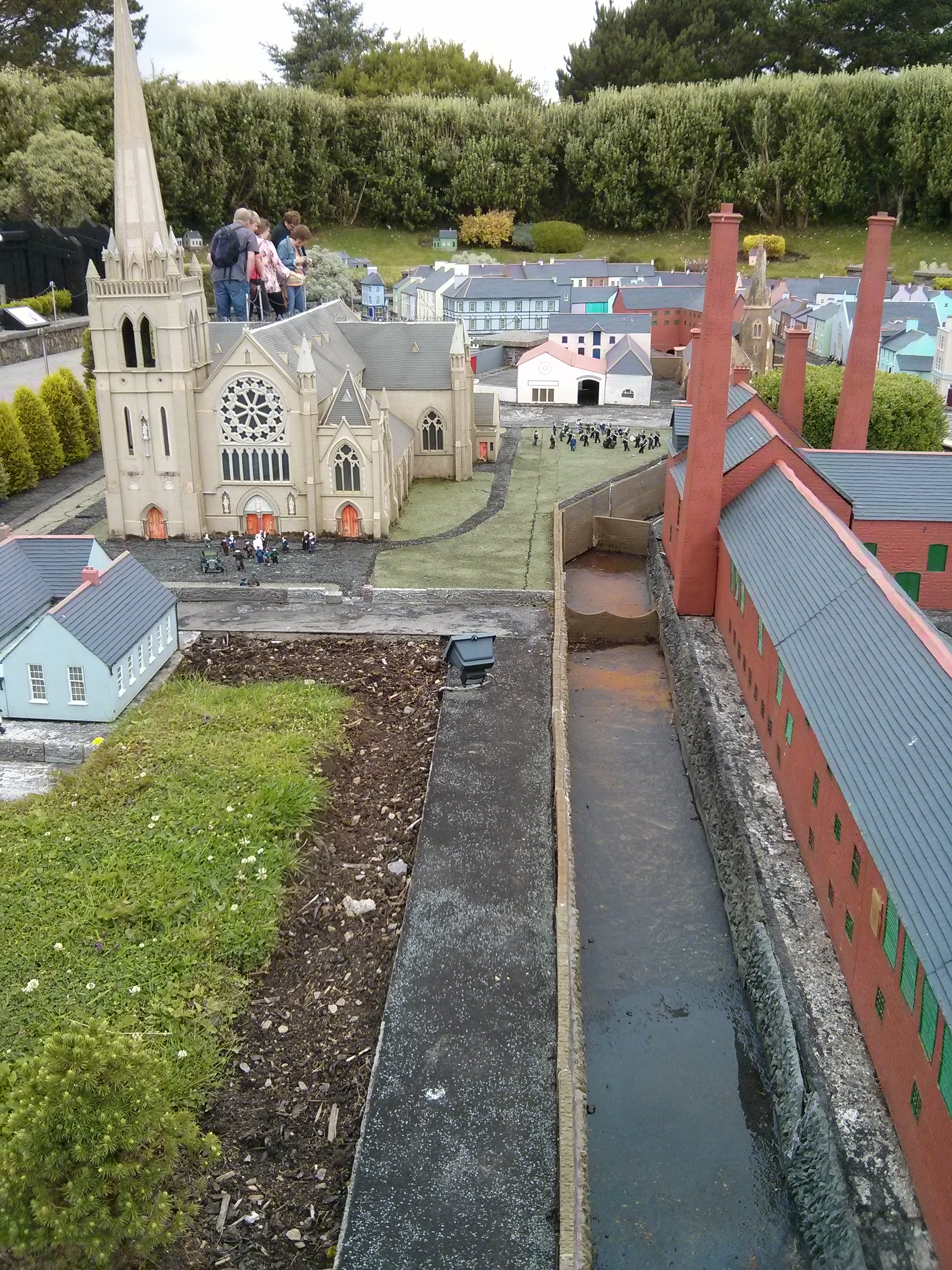
Model village

The Model Village in Clonakilty is a tourist destination in the area and includes fully scaled models of Clonakilty and nearby towns – built on a miniature of the area's railway line.

Michael Collins House is a museum dedicated to the Irish revolutionary leader Michael Collins. The museum is set out in a restored Georgian townhouse on Emmet Square, where Collins lived from 1903 to 1905. The museum tells the story of Collins' life and the history of Irish independence through tours, exhibits, interactive displays, and historical artefacts.

A "Random Acts of Kindness Festival" was set up by the local Clonakilty Macra na Feirme Club. The 2012 event ran over a weekend in July.

Clonakilty Street Carnival takes place in June of each year, and involves live music, activities and other events.

Other historical attractions in the town include the Clonakilty Museum, the Georgian houses of Emmet Square and the Michael Collins Centre which is located a few miles east of the town. Other attractions include the Clonakilty Black-pudding visitor centre and the Clonakilty Distillery visitor experience. A Farmers Market takes place at Emmet Square every Friday.

== Education ==
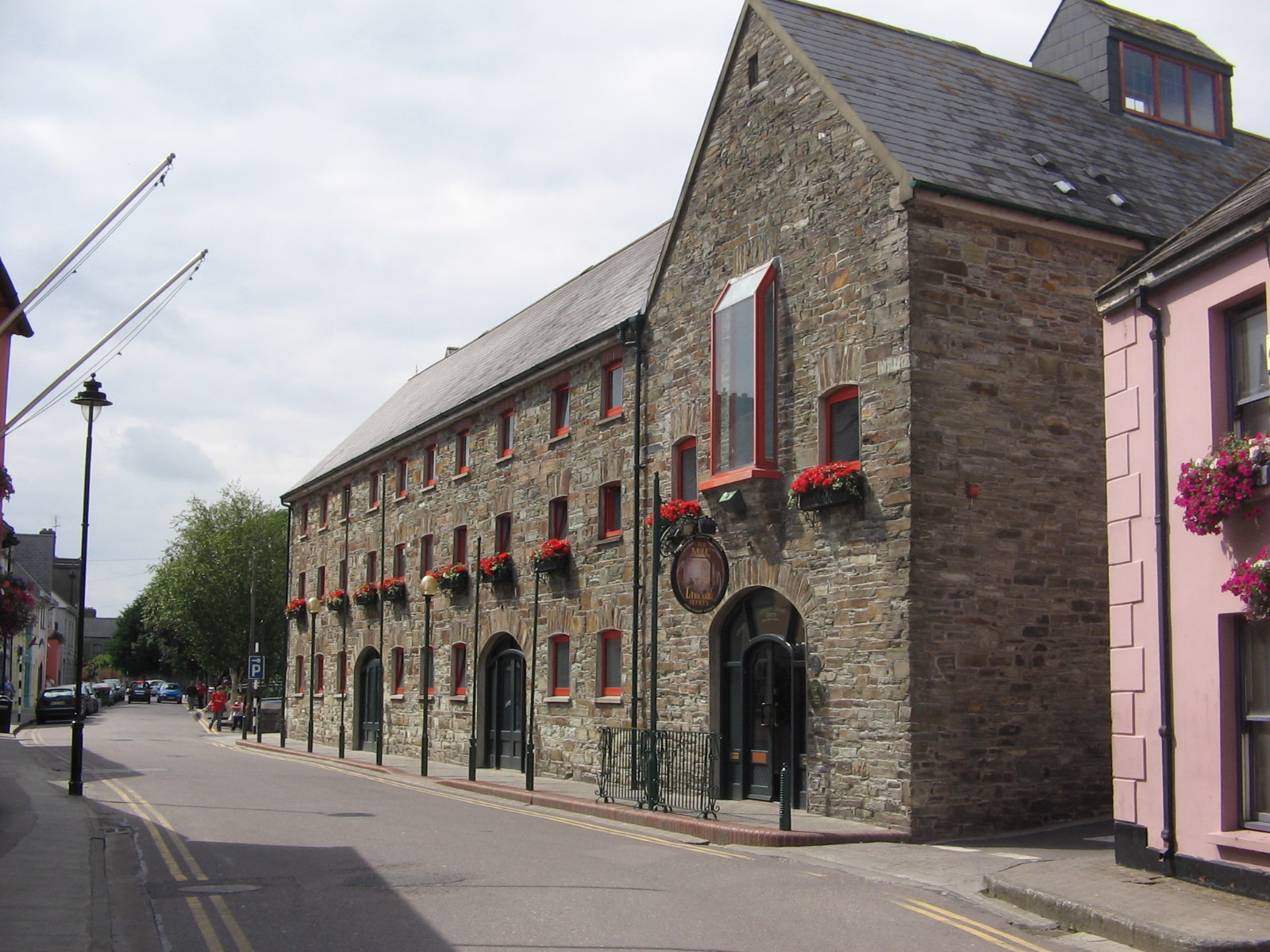
Clonakilty library

There are two secondary schools located in the town. Clonakilty Community College is a mixed school and the Sacred Heart Secondary School is an all-girls school. There are 4 Primary Schools located in the town. Clonakilty Agricultural College is located 2 miles east of the town. It is known locally as Darrara College and mainly deals with Agricultural Education.

== Sport ==
Clonakilty has a Gaelic Athletic Association club (Clonakilty GAA), soccer club (Clonakilty AFC), a rugby union club (Clonakilty RFC) and a martial arts club (Warrior Tae Kwon Do). Clonakilty GAA club won the Cork Senior Football Championship in 2009, 1996, and were runners-up in the 2003 competition. Clonakilty GAA won their first adult hurling county title when they won the Cork Minor B Hurling Championship in 2007. Clonakilty RFC became a senior rugby club in 2001 and spent 12 years in the All-Ireland League until they were relegated to Division 1 of the Munster Junior League. Clonakilty AFC have won the Beamish Cup on several occasions. Students of the Clonakilty "Warrior Tae Kwon Do" club compete in Tae Kwon Do, kickboxing and freestyle tournaments and the club has produced four world champions in several martial arts disciplines.

== Beaches ==
The closest Blue Flag beach is at Inchydoney Island, immediately to the south of the town.

Approximately 11 kilometres (6.8 mi) from Clonakilty, and looking out over the Galley Head lighthouse, is Long Strand. This sandy beach is a mile and a half long, and bounded by dunes at Castlefreke (a protected Special Area of Conservation).

Duneen Beach is across the bay from the right-hand side of Inchydoney beach.

== International relations ==
Clonakilty, which is a member of Cittaslow, has been twinned with:

- – Chateaulin, Brittany, France (in 1986)
- – Waldaschaff, Bavaria, Germany (since 1989)

== Notable people ==
=== Born in Clonakilty ===
- Peter Callanan, politician and Fianna Fáil senator
- Michael Collins, was born in Woodfield (now the Michael Collins Birthplace) 5 km west of Clonakilty, and lived in the town for a period.
- Tadhgo Crowley, footballer and All-Ireland Senior Football Championship winning captain (1945)
- Alfred Elmore, Victorian artist
- William Harnett, Irish-American artist
- Máire Ní Shíthe (1868–13 July 1955), Irish language writer and translator
- Val O'Donovan, entrepreneur and academic
- Mary Jane O'Donovan Rossa, poet and political activist
- Louise O'Neill, author
- Liam Twomey, politician and Fine Gael TD and senator

=== Notable residents ===
- Roy Harper, singer-songwriter
- Eamonn McGrath, author
- David Mitchell, author
- Noel Redding, musician
- Joseph Walsh, politician, Fianna Fáil TD and former Minister for Agriculture

== See also ==
- List of towns and villages in Ireland
- Market Houses in Ireland
- Clonakilty (Parliament of Ireland constituency)
