= Shannonvale, County Cork =

Village in County Cork, Ireland

Coordinates: 51.6470°N 8.8815°W

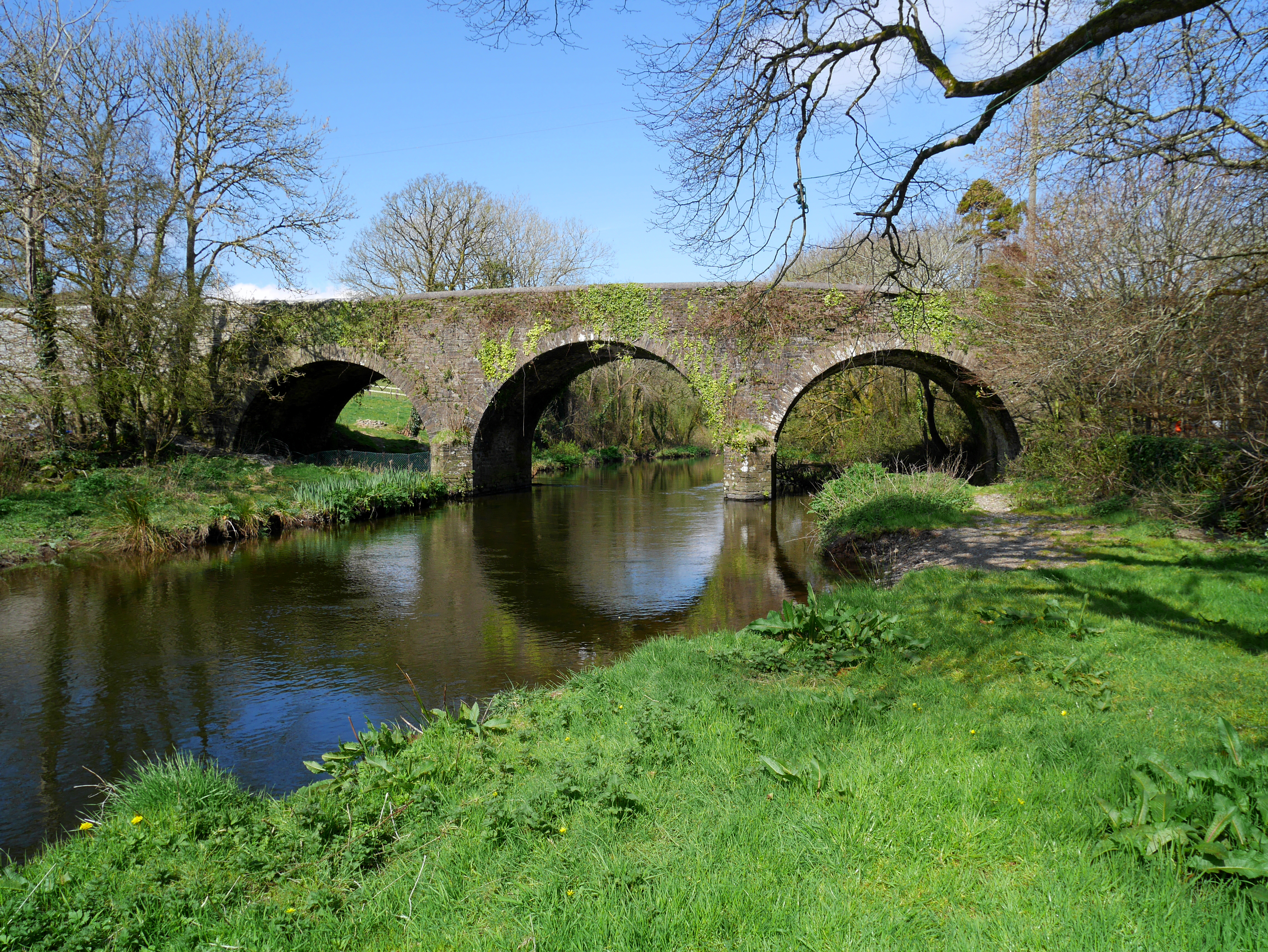
Shannon Vale bridge was built c. 1820

Shannonvale or Shannon Vale is a small rural village near Clonakilty in County Cork, Ireland. It lies in the civil parishes of Kilnagross and Templebryan. Evidence of ancient settlement in the area include stone circle, ogham stone and bullaun stone sites in a large ecclesiastical enclosure in the townland of Templebryan North. Shannonvale takes its name from the Earls of Shannon, who owned much of the land in the area and built a large house and mill locally in the mid-18th century. This flour mill was once served by a short spur line from the Cork, Bandon and South Coast Railway. The Battle of the Big Cross took place just north of the village during the Irish Rebellion of 1798.
