= O'Reilly baronets of Ballinlough (1795) =

Nugent Baronetcy, of Ballinlough
- Arms of the Nugent baronets of Ballinlough
- Creation date: 23 July 1795
- Baronetage: Baronetage of Ireland
- Status: Extant

The O'Reilly, later Nugent baronetcy, of Ballinlough in the County of Westmeath, was created in the Baronetage of Ireland on 23 July 1795 for Hugh O'Reilly. In 1812, on the death of his maternal uncle John Nugent, he assumed by Royal licence the surname of Nugent. The third Baronet was Chamberlain to the Emperor of Austria and was also created a Count of the Austrian Empire. The family seat is Ballinlough Castle, Clonmellon, County Westmeath.

== O'Reilly, later Nugent Baronets, of Ballinlough (1795) ==
- Sir Hugh O'Reilly, later Nugent, 1st Baronet (c. 1825)
- Sir James Nugent, 2nd Baronet (died 1843)
- Sir John Hugh Nugent, 3rd Baronet (1800–1859)
- Sir Hugh Joseph Nugent, 4th Baronet (1845–1863)
- Sir Charles Nugent, 5th Baronet (1847–1927)
- Sir Hugh Charles Nugent, 6th Baronet (1904–1983)
- Sir John Edwin Lavallin Nugent, 7th Baronet (1933–2009)
- Sir Nicholas Myles John Nugent, 8th Baronet (born 1967)

== Extended family ==
The 1st Baronet's younger brother Andrew O'Reilly was a General der Kavallerie in the Austrian Army and a Graf (Count) of the Austrian Empire. Their sister Margaret married Richard Talbot and was, as a widow, created Baroness Talbot of Malahide in 1831. The Austrian statesman and soldier Laval Graf Nugent von Westmeath also belonged to this family.
