= List of heritage sites in Kimberley =

This is a list of the heritage sites in Kimberley as recognised by the South African Heritage Resource Agency. Kimberley is a diamond-mining centre, and the capital of Northern Cape province, in the north-west portion of South Africa.

SAHRA identifier	Site name	Description	Town	District	NHRA status	Coordinates	Image
9/2/049/0002-021	115 Main Road, Kimberley		Kimberley	Kimberley	Register	28°45′01″S 24°46′43″E	Upload Photo
9/2/049/0002-025	35 Robinson Street, Kimberley		Kimberley	Kimberley	Register	28°45′16″S 24°47′01″E	Upload Photo
9/2/049/0002-026	117 Main Road, Kimberley		Kimberley	Kimberley	Register	28°45′00″S 24°46′42″E	Upload Photo
9/2/049/0002-028	83 Main Road, Kimberley		Kimberley	Kimberley	Register	28°45′11″S 24°46′50″E	Upload Photo
9/2/049/0002-029	85 Main Road, Kimberley		Kimberley	Kimberley	Register	28°45′11″S 24°46′49″E	Upload Photo
9/2/049/0002-032	95 Main Road, Kimberley		Kimberley	Kimberley	Register	28°45′08″S 24°46′47″E	Upload Photo
9/2/049/0002-033	97 Main Road, Kimberley		Kimberley	Kimberley	Register	28°45′07″S 24°46′47″E	Upload Photo
9/2/049/0002-035	31a Hercules Street, Kimberley		Kimberley	Kimberley	Register	28°45′16″S 24°46′57″E	Upload Photo
9/2/049/0002-040	Tucker Street, Kimberley		Kimberley	Kimberley	Register	28°44′15″S 24°45′17″E	
9/2/049/0002-045	97 Central Road, Kimberley		Kimberley	Kimberley	Register	28°45′10″S 24°46′36″E	Upload Photo
9/2/049/0002-046	41 Robinson Street, Kimberley		Kimberley	Kimberley	Register	28°45′14″S 24°47′02″E	Upload Photo
9/2/049/0002-066	81 Main Road, Kimberley		Kimberley	Kimberley	Register	28°45′12″S 24°46′50″E	Upload Photo
9/2/049/0002-068	Erf 1858, Main Road, Kimberley		Kimberley	Kimberley	Register	28°45′32″S 24°47′17″E	Upload Photo
9/2/049/0002-082	61 Hercules Street, Kimberley		Kimberley	Kimberley	Register	28°45′10″S 24°47′02″E	Upload Photo
9/2/049/0002-094	97 Hercules Street, Kimberley		Kimberley	Kimberley	Register	28°45′01″S 24°47′09″E	Upload Photo
9/2/049/0002-096	101 Hercules Street, Kimberley		Kimberley	Kimberley	Register	28°45′00″S 24°47′10″E	Upload Photo
9/2/049/0002-099	Neale Street, Kimberley		Kimberley	Kimberley	Register	28°45′17″S 24°47′09″E	Upload Photo
9/2/049/0002-100	5 Neale Street, Kimberley		Kimberley	Kimberley	Register	28°45′24″S 24°47′01″E	Upload Photo
9/2/049/0002-120	62 Hercules Street, Kimberley		Kimberley	Kimberley	Register	28°45′12″S 24°47′03″E	Upload Photo
9/2/049/0002-138	28 Main Road, Kimberley		Kimberley	Kimberley	Register	28°45′29″S 24°47′13″E	Upload Photo
9/2/049/0002-139	30-30A Main Road, Kimberley		Kimberley	Kimberley	Register	28°45′31″S 24°47′16″E	Upload Photo
9/2/049/0002-156	29 Tucker Street, Kimberley		Kimberley	Kimberley	Register	28°44′14″S 24°45′16″E	Upload Photo
9/2/049/0002-162	Erf 1709, Stanley Street, Kimberley		Kimberley	Kimberley	Register	28°45′22″S 24°47′07″E	Upload Photo
9/2/049/0002-259	120 Main Road, Kimberley		Kimberley	Kimberley	Register	28°45′07″S 24°46′47″E	Upload Photo
9/2/049/0002-263	33 Blacking Street, cnr Central Road, Kimberley		Kimberley	Kimberley	Register	28°45′23″S 24°46′58″E	Upload Photo
9/2/049/0003/001	Carrington Road Conservation Area, Kimberley	The houses on the West of Carrington Road were built over a 50-year period. From its inception early in 1870, until about 1885, buildings were Type of site: Conservation area Previous use: Residential. Current use: Residential.	Kimberley, Belgravia	Kimberley	Heritage Area	28°45′07″S 24°46′31″E	Upload Photo
9/2/049/0003/002	Belgravia Conservation Area, Kimberley	Type of site: Conservation area. Previous use: Residential. Current use: Residential.	Kimberley, Belgravia	Kimberley	Heritage Area	28°44′45″S 24°46′41″E	Upload Photo
9/2/049/0003/003	Milner Street/Memorial Road Conservation area	Type of site: Conservation area.	Kimberley, Belgravia	Kimberley	Heritage Area	28°44′50″S 24°46′25″E	Upload Photo
9/2/049/0004	Honoured Dead Memorial, Memorial Road, Kimberley	This memorial, which commemorates those who fell during the Kimberley Siege, was dedicated in For further details see file 1/NK/Kim/1 Type of site: Memorial Current use: Memorial. Cecil John Rhodes commissioned Sir Herbert Baker to design a memorial.	Kimberley, Memorial Road Area	Kimberley	Provincial Heritage Site	28°45′05″S 24°46′10″E	This memorial, which commemorates those who fell during the Kimberley Siege, was dedicated in For further details see file 1/NK/Kim/1 Type of site: Memorial Current use: Memorial. Cecil John Rhodes commissioned Sir Herbert Baker to design a memorial. Media related to Honoured Dead Memorial at Wikimedia Commons
9/2/049/0005	City Hall and Market Square, Kimberley	Type of site: City Hall. The Market Square was the centre around which the city of Kimberley grew. It was the scene of many important events in the history of this city, and of South Africa and Zimbabwe. The City Hall was designed by F C Rogers in the neo-classical style.	Kimberley	Kimberley	Provincial Heritage Site	28°44′17″S 24°45′51″E	Type of site: City Hall. The Market Square was the centre around which the city of Kimberley grew. It was the scene of many important events in the history of this city, and of South Africa and Zimbabwe. The City Hall was designed by F C Rogers in the neo-classical style.
9/2/049/0005/001	Market Square, Kimberley	This historic old Market Square lies in the heart of Kimberley. Round it developed not only the town of Kimberley but in one sense, the whole of the Northern Cape. Immediately after the discovery in 1871 of the deep diggings on the farm Dutoitspan, later Type of site: Square. The Market Square was the centre around which the City of Kimberley arose. It was the scene of many important events in the history of the City and of the Republic.	Kimberley	Kimberley	Provincial Heritage Site	28°44′18″S 24°45′50″E	Upload Photo
9/2/049/0005/002	City Hall, Market Square, Kimberley	Architectural style: Romian Corinthian style. Type of site: City Hall Current use: Civic: City hall.	Kimberley	Kimberley	Provincial Heritage Site		Architectural style: Romian Corinthian style. Type of site: City Hall Current use: Civic: City hall.
9/2/049/0006	Old High Court of Griqualand West, Southey Street, Kimberley	Single storey U-form complex of stone construction. Double storeyed corner flanks on front facade. There were problems with the building and at the end of 1886 the building was partially demolished. Type of site: Courthouse Previous use: Institutional : Government Offices. Current use: Civic – Courts. In 1876 the High Court of Griqualand West was moved from Barkly West to Kimberley.	Kimberley, CBD	Kimberley	Provincial Heritage Site	28°44′14″S 24°45′50″E	Upload Photo
9/2/049/0008	De Beers Consolidated Mines Limited Head Office, 36 Stockdale Street, Kimberley	The building is a double storey block in typical Kimberley red brick. The building was designed by White Cooper and erected in 1887 by the company Jones and Cole. Type of site: Commercial Current use: Commercial : Offices. These seven properties, together with the historic buildings thereon, are not only closely associated with the founding and growth of De Beers, the largest diamond mining company in South Africa, but also form the nucleus of the De Beers' conservation areas.	Kimberley, CBD	Kimberley	Provincial Heritage Site	28°44′17″S 24°45′47″E	The building is a double storey block in typical Kimberley red brick. The building was designed by White Cooper and erected in 1887 by the company Jones and Cole. Type of site: Commercial Current use: Commercial : Offices. These seven properties, together with the historic buildings thereon, are not only closely associated with the founding and growth of De Beers, the largest diamond mining company in South Africa, but also form the nucleus of the De Beers' conservation areas.
9/2/049/0009	De Beers Benefit Society Building, Stockdale Street, Kimberley	The building retains its solid Edwardian characteristics. It was built in red brick. The building was designed by D W Greatbatch and built in 1906. Type of site: Commercial Current use: Commercial – Offices. These seven properties, together with the historic buildings thereon, are not only closely associated with the founding and growth of De Beers, the largest diamond mining company in South Africa, but also form the nucleus of the De Beers' conservation areas.	Kimberley, CBD	Kimberley	Provincial Heritage Site	28°44′18″S 24°45′44″E	Upload Photo
9/2/049/0010	Old stables, Stockdale Street, Kimberley	It is a single storey rectangular building extending along Stockdale Street. Three substantial roof, in 1902 the plans for the stables were approved. As early as 1910 De Beers owned a fleet of cars and Type of site: Stables; Previous use: Transportation : Stables. Current use: Transportation : Parking Garage. These seven properties, together with the historic buildings thereon, are not only closely associated with the founding and growth of Dc Beers, the largest diamond mining company in South Africa, but also form the nucleus of the De Beers' conservation are	Kimberley, CBD	Kimberley	Provincial Heritage Site	28°44′17″S 24°45′44″E	Upload Photo
9/2/049/0011	Consolidated Building, Stockdale Street, Kimberley	This is a double storeyed neo-classical building with heavy parapet and is set on a substantial stone foundation. The building was built in 1926 and housed the Diamond Corporation Ltd headquarters. Type of site: Commercial Current use: Commercial – Offices. These seven properties, together with the historic buildings thereon, are not only closely associated with the founding and growth of Dc Beers, the largest diamond mining company in South Africa, but also form the nucleus of the De Beers' conservation area.	Kimberley, CBD	Kimberley	Provincial Heritage Site	28°44′21″S 24°45′44″E	Upload Photo
9/2/049/0013	Star of the West, North Circular Road, Kimberley	Double storey hotel with splay corner and hipped iron roof with turret ventilators. The top floor The plot first belonged to Richard Preston.In 1877 he was granted a license as a victualler. In 1900 Type of site: Commercial Previous use: Residential : Hotel. Current use: Commercial : Public bar. The Star of the West is a living museum of early Kimberley.	Kimberley, Open Mine Area	Kimberley	Provincial Heritage Site	28°44′11″S 24°45′17″E	Upload Photo
9/2/049/0015	Dutch Reformed Mother Church, Newton, Kimberley	The church is a fine example of Stucco architecture in Kimberley. The historic Dutch Reformed Mother Church at Newton, Kimberley, was built in three stages. The original church was designed by the Rev. J. D. Kestell, who was Minister in Kimberley between 1882 and 1893. The building was dedicated on 29 May 1886. The tow Type of site: Church Previous use: Religious : Church. Current use: Religious : Church. The historic Dutch Reformed Church at Newton, Kimberley was built in three stages. The original church was designed by the Rev J D Kestell, who was Minister in Kimberley between 1882 and 1893. The building was dedicated on 29 May 1886.	Kimberley, Albertynshof	Kimberley	Provincial Heritage Site	28°44′42″S 24°45′32″E	Upload Photo
9/2/049/0016	Alexander McGregor Memorial Museum, 10 Chapel Street, Kimberley	It is a double storey building with Victorian and Edwardian characteristics. It conforms very closely This imposing double-storeyed building, erected in 1907, was designed by the architect Carstairs Rogers on the instruction of Mrs Margaret McGregor as a memorial to her husband Alexander McGregor, a diamond pioneer who was the Mayor of Kimberley in 1886. T Type of site: Institutional. Previous use: Institutional : Museum. Current use: Museum. This imposing double storeyed building, erected 1907, was designed by the architect Carstairs Rogers on the instruction of Mrs Margaret McGregor as a memorial to her husband Alexander McGregor, a diamond pioneer who was the Mayor of Kimberley in 1886.	Kimberley, CBD	Kimberley	Provincial Heritage Site	28°44′20″S 24°45′57″E	It is a double storey building with Victorian and Edwardian characteristics. It conforms very closely This imposing double-storeyed building, erected in 1907, was designed by the architect Carstairs Rogers on the instruction of Mrs Margaret McGregor as a memorial to her husband Alexander McGregor, a diamond pioneer who was the Mayor of Kimberley in 1886. T Type of site: Institutional. Previous use: Institutional : Museum. Current use: Museum. This imposing double storeyed building, erected 1907, was designed by the architect Carstairs Rogers on the instruction of Mrs Margaret McGregor as a memorial to her husband Alexander McGregor, a diamond pioneer who was the Mayor of Kimberley in 1886. Media related to McGregor Museum at Wikimedia Commons
9/2/049/0017	The Corner, Dutoitspan Road, Kimberley	Double storey building with a facade of plaster and face brick. Decorative elements on top storey, Property purchased by P G Croxford in 1907 for 1700 pounds. Type of site: Commercial Current use: Commercial :Shop. A landmark in Kimberley. Part of a group of interesting buildings e.g. Kimberley Club, Alexander McG	Kimberley, CBD	Kimberley	Provincial Heritage Site	28°44′25″S 24°45′55″E	Double storey building with a facade of plaster and face brick. Decorative elements on top storey, Property purchased by P G Croxford in 1907 for 1700 pounds. Type of site: Commercial Current use: Commercial :Shop. A landmark in Kimberley. Part of a group of interesting buildings e.g. Kimberley Club, Alexander McG
9/2/049/0018	Kimberley Africana Library, Dutoitspan Road, Kimberley	The gallery inside the building has McFarlane's cast iron. The roof of the main library space is co The building was officially opened on 23 July 1887 by Mr Justice Lawrence. Type of site: Library Current use: Institutional: Museum. The building is one of the city's oldest and is an important example of its type.	Kimberley, CBD	Kimberley	Provincial Heritage Site	28°44′25″S 24°45′56″E	The gallery inside the building has McFarlane's cast iron. The roof of the main library space is co The building was officially opened on 23 July 1887 by Mr Justice Lawrence. Type of site: Library Current use: Institutional: Museum. The building is one of the city's oldest and is an important example of its type.
9/2/049/0019	Kimberley Club, 70 Dutoitspan Road, Kimberley	It is an imposing double-storey late nineteenth-century colonial building with a deep verandah. C J Rhodes, J B Robinson, Ernest Oppenheimer, Harry Oppenheimer, Lord Kitchener, Gen French, Field Marshal Montgomery, Duke of Connought, Prince of Wales Historical Interest "The original building of the Kimberley Club, which was founded in 1881, burnt down in 1886, as did its replacement in 1895. The present building, designed by the architect D. W. Greatbach, was completed in 1896. It was extended in 191x. Type of site: Club Current use: Social : Club. The original building of the Kimberley Club, which was founded in 1881, burnt down in 1886, as did its replacement in 1895. The present building, designed by the architect D W Greatbatch, was completed in 1896.	Kimberley, CBD	Kimberley	Provincial Heritage Site	28°44′27″S 24°45′57″E	It is an imposing double-storey late nineteenth-century colonial building with a deep verandah. C J Rhodes, J B Robinson, Ernest Oppenheimer, Harry Oppenheimer, Lord Kitchener, Gen French, Field Marshal Montgomery, Duke of Connought, Prince of Wales Historical Interest "The original building of the Kimberley Club, which was founded in 1881, burnt down in 1886, as did its replacement in 1895. The present building, designed by the architect D. W. Greatbach, was completed in 1896. It was extended in 191x. Type of site: Club Current use: Social : Club. The original building of the Kimberley Club, which was founded in 1881, burnt down in 1886, as did its replacement in 1895. The present building, designed by the architect D W Greatbatch, was completed in 1896. Media related to Kimberley Club at Wikimedia Commons
9/2/049/0020	Kimberley Masonic Temple, 126–128 Dutoitspan Road, Kimberley	It is a single-storey corrugated iron structure with a saddle roof and centrally placed air vent. A verandah is found to the rear of the building. The Union Lodge initiated the erection of this building in 1886 after the Freemasons at the diamond fields of kimberley realised the necessity to have an own Temple. The foundation-stone of the building was laid on 18 December 1886. Type of site: Masonic Lodge Current use: Social: Masonic Temple. It is an important qualitative architectural element in the street scene of Dutoitspan Road.	Kimberley, Memorial Road Area	Kimberley	Provincial Heritage Site	28°45′26″S 24°47′13″E	Upload Photo
9/2/049/0021-001	Henrietta Stockdale Chapel, Kimberley Hospital, Dutoitspan Road, Kimberley	Small red brick chapel with corrugated iron saddle roof and entrance portico. Hidden amongst the other buildings of the Kimberley Hospital in Dutoitspan Road stands one of the most dignified and historical little chapels in this City of Diamonds. Diamonds were discovered there in the beginning of 1871. Type of site: Chapel Current use: Religious : Chapel. The chapel is proclaimed to be a monument to commemorate the pioneer work of Sister Henrietta Stockdale for the training of nurses and in recognition of the profession in South Africa.	Kimberley, Memorial Road Area	Kimberley	Provincial Heritage Site	28°44′45″S 24°46′22″E	Upload Photo
9/2/049/0022	McGregor Museum, Atlas Street, Kimberley	Designed by DW Greatbatch, the Sanatorium was erected in 1897 as a prestige hotel and health resort This Victorian building, designed by the architect D.W. Greatbatch, was erected in 1897 as a recuperative hotel and was known as the Kimberley Sanatorium. In 1908 De Beers Consolidated Mines changed the name to Belgrave Hotel and it served as a luxury hotel. Type of site: Civic Current use: Museum. This building, designed by th architect D W Greatbatch, was erected in 1897 as a recuperative hotel and was known as the Kimberley Sanatorium. In 1908 De Beers Consolidated Mines changed the name to Belgrave Hotel and it served as a luxury hotel until the 1930s.	Kimberley, Belgravia	Kimberley	Provincial Heritage Site	28°44′59″S 24°46′48″E	Designed by DW Greatbatch, the Sanatorium was erected in 1897 as a prestige hotel and health resort This Victorian building, designed by the architect D.W. Greatbatch, was erected in 1897 as a recuperative hotel and was known as the Kimberley Sanatorium. In 1908 De Beers Consolidated Mines changed the name to Belgrave Hotel and it served as a luxury hotel. Type of site: Civic Current use: Museum. This building, designed by th architect D W Greatbatch, was erected in 1897 as a recuperative hotel and was known as the Kimberley Sanatorium. In 1908 De Beers Consolidated Mines changed the name to Belgrave Hotel and it served as a luxury hotel until the 1930s.
9/2/049/0023	Duggan-Cronin Gallery, 12 Egerton Road, Kimberley	This magnificent Victorian dwelling, formerly known as The Lodge, was designed by the architect Sydney Stent and built in 1889 as residence for Mr John Blades Currey, manager of the London & S.A. Exploration Co. It was taken over by De Beers Consolidated Mines Ltd in 1899. It was made available to Alfred Martin Duggan-Cronin from the late 1930s to establish the 'Bantu Gallery'. Type of site: Institutional: Museum Previous use: Residential : Single. Current use: Institutional: Museum (part of McGregor Museum)	Kimberley, Belgravia	Kimberley	Provincial Heritage Site	28°44′56″S 24°46′49″E	This magnificent Victorian dwelling, formerly known as The Lodge, was designed by the architect Sydney Stent and built in 1889 as residence for Mr John Blades Currey, manager of the London & S.A. Exploration Co. It was taken over by De Beers Consolidated Mines Ltd in 1899. It was made available to Alfred Martin Duggan-Cronin from the late 1930s to establish the 'Bantu Gallery'. Type of site: Institutional: Museum Previous use: Residential : Single. Current use: Institutional: Museum (part of McGregor Museum) Media related to Duggan-Cronin Gallery at Wikimedia Commons
9/2/049/0024	Kimberley Girls' High School, Rendlesham Road, Kimberley	Single-storeyed school building on prominent corner site erected in 1906. The Girls High Type of site: School Previous use: School. Current use: Educational. The cornerstone of this impressive red-brick building complex, designed by the architect D.W. Greatbatch, was laid on 17 May 1906. the Contractor was J. Newton and the terra-cotta work was executed by the firm church & McLauchlin.	Kimberley, Belgravia	Kimberley	Provincial Heritage Site	28°44′52″S 24°46′41″E	Upload Photo
9/2/049/0025	Beit House, Edgerton Road, Kimberley	It is a large double storeyed Victorian property and consists of a main bay and 2 projecting bays at The building was built as a hostel possibly by Timlin and named after Sir Alfred Beit. Type of site: House Current use: Residential: School Hostel.	Kimberley, Belgravia	Kimberley	Provincial Heritage Site	28°44′46″S 24°46′50″E	Upload Photo
9/2/049/0026	Beaconsfield Post Office, Central Road, Kimberley	Double storey building of stone, with a corrugated iron verandah sloping at the same angle as the road. Beaconsfield evolved after the finding of diamonds in 1870. It was first known as Dutoitspan. The cornerstone of this Victorian double-storeyed building of blue kimberlite was laid in 1881, but the building was only completed in 1888. Type of site: Post Office Previous use: Institutional : Court House. Current use: Institutional : Post Office. The building was originally used as the magistrate's court of Beaconsfield.	Kimberley, Beaconsfield	Kimberley	Provincial Heritage Site	28°45′29″S 24°47′07″E	Upload Photo
9/2/049/0027	Beaconsfield Library, 34 Central Road, Kimberley	Facebrick building with a hipped iron roof, surrounded by a verandah with facebrick columns. The building was built in about 1880 as the head office of the London and South African Exploration Type of site: Library Current use: Institutional : Library. When the inhabitants of Beaconsfield decided to establish a library they turned to John B Curry.	Kimberley, Beaconsfield	Kimberley	Provincial Heritage Site	28°45′30″S 24°47′05″E	Upload Photo
9/2/049/0028	Union Masonic Temple, 4 Free State Road, Kimberley	Corrugated iron building with saddle roof, extended at the back at a lower pitch. The Union Lodge initiated the erection of this building in 1886 after the Freemasons at the diamond fields of Kimberley realised the necessity to have their own Temple. The foundation stone of the building was laid on 18 December 1886. Type of site: Masonic Lodge Current use: Social : Masonic Temple.	Kimberley, Beaconsfield	Kimberley	Provincial Heritage Site	28°45′25″S 24°47′13″E	Upload Photo
9/2/049/0029	First Seventh Day Adventist Church, Blacking Street, Kimberley	Small corrugated iron L-shaped church with gothic windows and entrance portico. At the corner of Blacking Street and Dyer Place in Beaconsfield there stands a small corrugated iron church. It is the Mother Church of the Seventh Day Adventists, not only in South Africa but also in Australia, to which country the movement spread from here. Type of site: Church Previous use: Religious : Church. Current use: Religious: Church. This church is the original church in the Republic of South Africa of the Seventh Day Adventist Church.	Kimberley, Beaconsfield	Kimberley	Provincial Heritage Site	28°45′20″S 24°47′03″E	Upload Photo
9/2/049/0030	Kimberley Boys' High School, Memorial Road, Kimberley	Type of site: School Current use: Educational : Secondary. The school building represents the peak of an architects school in Kimberley.	Kimberley, Memorial Road Area	Kimberley	Provincial Heritage Site	28°44′56″S 24°46′11″E	Upload Photo
9/2/049/0030-001	Main building, Kimberley Boys' High School, Memorial Road, Kimberley	The main building consists of a double storey central part with single storey wings on either side. The cornerstone was laid on 8 April 1913. The building was designed by D W Greatbatch. Type of site: School Current use: Educational : Secondary. The school building represents the peak of an architects school in Kimberley.	Kimberley, Memorial Road Area	Kimberley	Provincial Heritage Site	28°44′56″S 24°46′11″E	Upload Photo
9/2/049/0030-002	Sports pavilion, Kimberley Boys' High School, Memorial Road, Kimberley	The building is strongly symmetrical. The building consists of a central double storey part with wings. The cornerstone was laid on 8 September 1905 by Col, David Harris. It was originally a clubhouse. Type of site: Pavilion Current use: Sports pavilion. Designed by the famous Kimberley architect D W Greatbatch	Kimberley	Kimberley	Provincial Heritage Site	28°45′06″S 24°46′00″E	Upload Photo
9/2/049/0030-003	Memorial Library, Kimberley Boys' High School, Memorial Road, Kimberley	Type of site: Library Current use: Library.	Kimberley	Kimberley	Provincial Heritage Site	28°44′57″S 24°46′13″E	Upload Photo
9/2/049/0033	Kimberley Regiment Drill Hall, 31 Park Road, Kimberley	Red brick building with gabled pediment upon which the coat of arms of the Kimberley Regiment is found. Designed by D W Greatbatch in 1892 to house the South African and International Exhibition Type of site: Drill Hall Current use: Military : Headquarters. This building was built as part of the South African international exhibition in 1892.	Kimberley, Belgravia	Kimberley	Provincial Heritage Site	28°44′34″S 24°46′36″E	Upload Photo
9/2/049/0034	Queens Park, Park Road, Kimberley	The park contains many fine trees, shrubberies and fountains, a fine old facebrick Tennis Club pavilion. The park was created in 1874 as the Kimberley Public Gardens and soon became a popular venue. Activities included weekend concerts by the Philharmonic Society's Brass band in the bandstand (now dismantled), cricket matches, and swimming in the pool. Type of site: Recreational Current use: Recreational.	Kimberley, Belgravia	Kimberley	Register	28°44′39″S 24°46′23″E	Upload Photo
9/2/049/0035	Old Undenominational School, Lanyon Terrace, Kimberley	Presenting a very well balanced main elevation, at the time of its erection the school was one of Ki at a meeting in 1886 it was decided that Public Undenominational Schools should be established. Type of site: School Current use: Educational. The complex consists of the Boys' and Girls' Schools together with the Kindergarten (1903) and more.	Kimberley, CBD	Kimberley	Provincial Heritage Site	28°44′24″S 24°46′13″E	Upload Photo
9/2/049/0039	Oriental Building, 27 De Beers Road, Kimberley	Double storey commercial building, originally with hipped roof. Ornate detailing on front facade. Constructed c. 1904 by Maply Sammy, whose family ran a business there until 1946. Type of site: Commercial Current use: Commercial: Restaurant. The Oriental building is the only remaining example of its architectural type in Kimberley.	Kimberley, CBD	Kimberley	Provisional Protection	28°44′15″S 24°46′02″E	Upload Photo
9/2/049/0040	St Alban's Church, 2 Takoon Square, Kimberley	Single storey building of crucifix form with cement plastered exterior. All openings are in gothic. Type of site: Church Current use: Religious: Church.	Kimberley, De Beers	Kimberley	Provincial Heritage Site	28°44′10″S 24°46′15″E	Upload Photo
9/2/049/0041	Old De Beers Mining Company Offices, 4 Warren Street, Kimberley	This single storeyed late Victorian building is typical of the late 1880s. It was here that the head office of De Beers Mining Company was formed by C J Rhodes and C D Rudd. Type of site: Commercial Previous use: Commercial : Office. Current use: Commercial : NMC Northern Cape Regional Office. These seven properties, together with the historic buildings thereon, are not only closely associated with the founding and growth of De Beers, the largest diamond mining company in South Africa, but also form the nucleus of the De Beers' conservation area.	Kimberley, De Beers	Kimberley	Provincial Heritage Site	28°44′11″S 24°46′24″E	This single storeyed late Victorian building is typical of the late 1880s. It was here that the head office of De Beers Mining Company was formed by C J Rhodes and C D Rudd. Type of site: Commercial Previous use: Commercial : Office. Current use: Commercial : NMC Northern Cape Regional Office. These seven properties, together with the historic buildings thereon, are not only closely associated with the founding and growth of De Beers, the largest diamond mining company in South Africa, but also form the nucleus of the De Beers' conservation area.
9/2/049/0042	Old School of Mines, Hull Street, Kimberley	The building represents the last phase of the Victorian architectural style in South Africa. The historic mining school building was erected in the late Victorian architectural style in 1899 to house the first technical training school for the mining industry in South Africa. It is therefore closely associated with the development of the mining. Type of site: School Previous use: Educational. Current use: Social : Theatre.	Kimberley, Turner Road Industrial Area	Kimberley	Provincial Heritage Site	28°43′45″S 24°46′20″E	Upload Photo
9/2/049/0045	Sol Plaatje Education Trust Library, (Sol Plaatje House) 32 Angel Street, Kimberley	Typical Kimberley house with hipped roof and verandah on precast columns. The house was purchased by 'Plaatje Jubilee Trust' and given to Solomon Plaatje who was born in 1876. Type of site: Residential, Library Previous use: Residential : Single. Current use: Educational: School. Plaatje besides being a politician was the first black man in S A to write an English novel.	Kimberley, New Park	Kimberley	Provincial Heritage Site	28°44′46″S 24°45′48″E	Upload Photo
9/2/049/0046	Old Residency, 4 Bennett Street, Kimberley	Single storeyed building with outer walls constructed of dressed dolorite between brick quoins. The house was built for the Civil Commissioner in July 1881. The building was designed by H A Greave Type of site: Residency Previous use: Residential : Single. Current use: Residential : House. The Residency is Kimberley's oldest surviving residence of any substance. It is virtually unaltered.	Kimberley, De Beers	Kimberley	Provincial Heritage Site	28°43′54″S 24°46′23″E	Upload Photo
9/2/049/0055	Rockmount, 20 Carrington Road, Kimberley	Large double storey facebrick house with saddle roof and projecting timbered gables. Fine timber verandah. French doors. Fine front door with stained glass. Facebrick and wrought iron fence. Type of site: House Current use: Residential. These seven properties, together with the historic buildings thereon, are not only closely associated with the founding and growth of De Beers, the largest diamond mining company in South Africa, but also form the nucleus of the De Beers' conservation area.	Kimberley	Kimberley	Provincial Heritage Site	28°45′05″S 24°46′31″E	Upload Photo
9/2/049/0060	Cape Police Memorial, Lodge Road, Kimberley	Memorial comprising statue of a policeman on an elaborate plinth with lonic columns and two crouching lions at the base. Type of site: Memorial.	Kimberley	Kimberley	Register	28°44′45″S 24°46′39″E	Upload Photo
9/2/049/0067	Kumo, 42 Carrington Road, Kimberley	Hipped roof surmounted by louvred ventilator, small decorated gable above door. Bullnose verandah. House designed by D.W Greatbatch, built in 1898 and was then on the outskirts of the town. Type of site: House Current use: Residential.	Kimberley	Kimberley	Provincial Heritage Site	28°45′14″S 24°46′20″E	Upload Photo
9/2/049/0069	199 Dutoitspan Road, Kimberley	Plastered, with modern timber facing on gable, steel windows, modern awing and masonry verandah. Type of site: House Current use: Residential. Intrinsic architectural and cultural significance.	Kimberley, Belgravia	Kimberley	Register	28°44′42″S 24°46′21″E	Upload Photo
9/2/049/0071	203 Dutoitspan Road, Kimberley	Original decorative brickwork. Steel windows, modern pipe verandah columns, vibracrete wall. Type of site: House Current use: Residential. Intrinsic architectural and cultural significance.	Kimberley, Belgravia	Kimberley	Register	28°44′48″S 24°46′29″E	Upload Photo
9/2/049/0072	205 Dutoitspan Road, Kimberley	Original brickwork, bargeboard and front door. Steel windows, no verandah trim. Type of site: House Current use: Residential. Intrinsic architectural and cultural significance.	Kimberley, Belgravia	Kimberley	Register	28°44′48″S 24°46′30″E	Upload Photo
9/2/049/0073	207 Du Toitspan Road, Kimberley	Plastered, verandah closed with steel bars, steel windows, vibricate wall. Type of site: House Current use: Residential. Intrinsic architectural and cultural significance.	Kimberley, Belgravia	Kimberley	Register	28°44′47″S 24°46′27″E	Upload Photo
9/2/049/0074	209 Dutoitspan Road, Kimberley	Original brickwork, verandah trim and French doors. Steel window in gable. Type of site: House Current use: Residential. Intrinsic architectural and cultural significance.	Kimberley, Belgravia	Kimberley	Register	28°44′52″S 24°46′33″E	Upload Photo
9/2/049/0076	213 Dutoitspan Road, Kimberley	Painted. Original verandah columns and bargeboard. Steel windows, vibracrete fence. Type of site: House Current use: Residential. Intrinsic architectural and cultural significance	Kimberley, Belgravia	Kimberley	Register	28°44′51″S 24°46′32″E	Upload Photo
9/2/049/0077	215 Dutoitspan Road, Kimberley	Gable painted with steel window. Original French door and verandah columns, new front door. Type of site: House Current use: Residential. Intrinsic architectural and cultural significance	Kimberley, Belgravia	Kimberley	Register	28°44′52″S 24°46′35″E	Upload Photo
9/2/049/0078	217 Dutoitspan Road, Kimberley	Original brickwork, verandah trim and door. Steel window. Original wall, modern wrought iron railing. Type of site: House Current use: Residential. Intrinsic architectural and cultural significance	Kimberley, Belgravia	Kimberley	Register	28°44′51″S 24°46′33″E	Upload Photo
9/2/049/0081	Derrycreevy, 18 Elsmere Road, Kimberley	Edwardian house with complex roofs with gablet ventilators. Projecting gable and bay. Type of site: House Current use: Residential : House. This impressive row of houses with their Victorian and Edwardian features forms an integral part of the architectural street scene of Elsmere Road and is in itself also an attractive architectural unit.	Kimberley, Belgravia	Kimberley	Provincial Heritage Site	28°44′53″S 24°46′40″E	Upload Photo
9/2/049/0082	Toeka, 20 Elsmere Road, Kimberley	Plastered house with half-hipped roof with ridge cresting. Ogee verandah with fine timber. Type of site: House Current use: Residential : House. This impressive row of houses with their Victorian and Edwardian features forms an integral part of the architectural street scene of Elsmere Road and is in itself also an attractive architectural unit.	Kimberley, Belgravia	Kimberley	Provincial Heritage Site	28°44′54″S 24°46′42″E	Upload Photo
9/2/049/0083	22 Elsmere Road, Kimberley	Facebrick house with saddle roof and projecting decorated gable with bay window. Bullnose verandah. Type of site: House Current use: Residential : House. This dwelling, with its predominantly Victorian characteristics, forms an integral part of the architectural character of Elsmere road, Belgravia, which was laid out in 1898. H.A. Morris, a Freeman of the City of Kimberley, lived here, circa 1922–1977.	Kimberley, Belgravia	Kimberley	Provincial Heritage Site	28°44′54″S 24°46′42″E	Upload Photo
9/2/049/0084	24 Elsmere Road, Kimberley	Facebrick house with hipped iron roof and projecting gable with bay window. Ogee verandah on two sides. Type of site: House Current use: Residential : House. This impressive row of houses with their Victorian and Edwardian features forms an integral part of the architectural street scene of Elsmere Road and is in itself also an attractive architectural unit.	Kimberley, Belgravia	Kimberley	Provincial Heritage Site	28°44′54″S 24°46′43″E	Upload Photo
9/2/049/0085	Rudd House, 5 Loch Road, Kimberley	The complex includes a conservatory, stables and coach house and a small c/iron shack. The large house, originally known as 'The Bungalow' was erected for the mining magnate, C D Rudd. Type of site: Civic Previous use: Residential : Single. Current use: Institutional : Museum. The house was in all probability one of the first large permanent homes built. Kimberley.	Kimberley, Belgravia	Kimberley	Provincial Heritage Site	28°44′44″S 24°46′33″E	Upload Photo
9/2/049/0086	7 Lodge Road, Kimberley	Large facebrick house with hipped tiled roof and projecting decorated gable. The house was designed by D W Greatbach for Sir Ernest Oppenheimer in 1906. Type of site: House Current use: Residential : House.	Kimberley, Belgravia	Kimberley	Provincial Heritage Site	28°44′47″S 24°46′45″E	Upload Photo
9/2/049/0087	9 Lodge Road, Kimberley	Facebrick house, decorated gables at the front and corner. Bullnose verandah with timber columns. This house was designed by D.W. Greatbatch in 1911 for R.T. Horwitz Type of site: House Current use: Residential.	Kimberley, Belgravia	Kimberley	Register	28°44′48″S 24°46′47″E	Upload Photo
9/2/049/0088	Dunluce, 10 Lodge Road, Kimberley	Double-storeyed residence of square form with complex roof. Decorative wooden fretwork on wrap-around. This late-Victorian mansion, with its magnificent wooden decorated verandah, was designed in 1897 by D. W. Greatbatch for a member of the Diamond Syndicate, Gustav Bonus. John Orr, the well-known merchant, lived in the building from 1903 till his death. Type of site: House Current use: Residential : House. This house, with its magnificent wooden decorated verandah, was designed in 1897 by D W Greatbatch for a member of the Diamond Syndicate, Gustav Bonas. John Orr, the well-known merchant, lived Dunluce from 1903 till his death in 1932.	Kimberley, Belgravia	Kimberley	Provincial Heritage Site	28°44′50″S 24°46′45″E	Upload Photo
9/2/049/0089	Lindow House, 11 Lodge Road, Kimberley	Facebrick house with a half-hipped roof, a projecting covered gable and a high ornamented brick par Type of site: House Previous use: Residential: Single. Current use: Residential: House. The house stands opposite 'Dunluce' and makes a considerable impact on the streetscape of Lodge Road.	Kimberley, Belgravia	Kimberley	Provincial Heritage Site	28°44′48″S 24°46′48″E	Upload Photo
9/2/049/0090	The Grange, 13 Lodge Road, Kimberley	Single storeyed Edwardian residence. Front facade has high pitched roof and triangular end gables. Type of site: House Current use: Residential: House. These seven properties, together with the historic buildings thereon, are not only closely associated with the founding and growth of De Beers, the largest diamond mining company in South Africa, but also form the nucleus of the De Beers' conservation area.	Kimberley, Belgravia	Kimberley	Provincial Heritage Site	28°44′49″S 24°46′50″E	Upload Photo
9/2/049/0091	Armagh, 40 Memorial Road, Kimberley	Type of site: House Current use: Residential. Armagh is a superb example of consolidation phase architecture in Kimberley. The residence was designed by the architect Carstairs Rogers in 1901 for Robert Hugh Henderson, founder of the international firm Henderson and Co. General Dealers, and mayor.	Kimberley	Kimberley	Provincial Heritage Site	28°44′56″S 24°46′16″E	Upload Photo
9/2/049/0092	5 Rendlesham Road, Kimberley	House with hipped roof, covered gable towards Elsmere Road, and bullnose verandah on double timber. Type of site: House Current use: Residential. Intrinsic architectural and cultural significance.	Kimberley, Belgravia	Kimberley	Register	28°44′51″S 24°46′39″E	Upload Photo
9/2/049/0093	Rugby House, 28 Roper Street, Kimberley	Ranch-style house with tiled roof, gables with small pane windows, ronghiast plaster; based on the first owner of the erf was Mr W M Willis who took transfer of the property in 1884. Type of site: House Previous use: Residential. Current use: Residential : House. Rugby House is unique in South Africa. Frederick James Dobbin, a famous Springbok rugby player built	Kimberley, CBD	Kimberley	Provincial Heritage Site	28°44′10″S 24°46′00″E	Upload Photo
9/2/049/0095	14 West Circular Road, Kimberley	Small corrugated iron miner's cottage with saddle roof and verandah with wooden columns. The ground was granted to Octavius Broomhead in May 1878, who was the owner of the Arctic Bar. Type of site: House Previous use: Residential. Current use: Residential : House. The house is of significant architectural and historical importance as it is probably Kimberley's fi...	Kimberley, Open Mine Area	Kimberley	Provincial Heritage Site	28°44′25″S 24°45′16″E	Upload Photo
9/2/049/0096	Memorial to the Pioneers of Aviation, Alexandersfontein, Kimberley District	Hangar of rectangular form built from corrugated iron. Hangar houses the Compton Paterson biplane. The Memorial to the Pioneers of Aviation, consisting of a symbolic monument designed by A.: P. du Toit and replicas of the first hangar and Compton Paterson biplane, was erected on the site of the original airfield where Cecil Compton Paterson established ????. Type of site: Memorial Current use: Institutional : Museum.	Kimberley	Kimberley	Provincial Heritage Site	28°48′46″S 24°47′11″E	Upload Photo
9/2/049/0097	Jack Hindon Officers' Club, Alexandersfontein, Kimberley District	It consists of a double storeyed T Shaped building. It has a colonnaded balcony running along all sides. This magnificent building, with its Victorian and Edwardian features, was designed in 1900 by the well-known architect Daniel Westwood Greatbach. It replaced the old Alexandersfontein Hotel building, which was restored in 1881. The building that was completed in October 1902 was enlarged in 1907. Type of site: Club Previous use: Residential : Hotel – Educational. Current use: Military : Officer's mess.	Kimberley	Kimberley	Provincial Heritage Site	28°49′12″S 24°47′23″E	Upload Photo
9/2/049/0098	Magersfontein Battlefield, Kimberley District	The Battlefield consists of a plain adjoining a series of hills. Monuments have been erected at various spots. Magersfontein was the site of one of the major battles of the Anglo-Boer War 1899–1902. Type of site: Battlefield. Current use: Institutional: Museum and Battlefield. One of the major battles of the Anglo-Boer War, the Battle of Magersfontein took place here on 11 December 1899.	Kimberley	Kimberley	Provincial Heritage Site	28°58′09″S 24°41′54″E	The Battlefield consists of a plain adjoining a series of hills. Monuments have been erected at various spots. Magersfontein was the site of one of the major battles of the Anglo-Boer War 1899–1902. Type of site: Battlefield. Current use: Institutional: Museum and Battlefield. One of the major battles of the Anglo-Boer War, the Battle of Magersfontein took place here on 11 December 1899. Media related to Magersfontein Battlefield Memorials at Wikimedia Commons
9/2/049/0100	Homestead, Secretarius, Kimberley District	The farmstead is a rare survivor of pre-Victorian architecture in the N. Cape. Carl Lorenz Theodore Radloff born in Prussia in 1808 came to the country as a missionary and bought Type of site: House Current use: Residence: Farmstead. The Secretarius farmstead is a rare blend of pre-Victorian and Victorian rural architecture.	Kimberley	Kimberley	Provincial Heritage Site	28°42′35″S 24°29′50″E	Upload Photo
9/2/049/0102	Shooting Box complex, Rooipoort, Kimberley district	The complex consists of a homestead, stables, cooler and store rooms. Type of site: Shooting Box Current use: Residential : Hunting Lodge.	Kimberley	Kimberley	Provincial Heritage Site	28°38′10″S 24°17′00″E	Upload Photo
9/2/049/0105	Glacial pavements, Nooitgedacht, Kimberley District	The ancient glaciers moved outwards from old mountain areas and the scratched surfaces are now exposed. The farm Nooitgedacht lies on the left bank of the Vaal River some 40 km from Kimberley, on the right of the road to Barkly West. Driekopseiland is a farm on the Riet River about 64 km south-west of Kimberley. During the remote geological epoch. Type of site: Rock engravings/Glacial pavement Current use: Archaeological site. The exposures on Nooitgedacht are excellent examples of glacial pavements and have been preserved.		Kimberley	Provincial Heritage Site	28°36′00″S 24°36′50″E	The ancient glaciers moved outwards from old mountain areas and the scratched surfaces are now exposed. The farm Nooitgedacht lies on the left bank of the Vaal River some 40 km from Kimberley, on the right of the road to Barkly West. Driekopseiland is a farm on the Riet River about 64 km south-west of Kimberley. During the remote geological epoch. Type of site: Rock engravings/Glacial pavement Current use: Archaeological site. The exposures on Nooitgedacht are excellent examples of glacial pavements and have been preserved.
9/2/049/0106	Trinity Methodist Church, Chapel Street, Kimberley	The external detail is Gothic. The fine red brick is typically 'Church and McLauchlin'. During the early 19th century, the Methodist congregation was supported by a group of people willing Type of site: Church Current use: Religious: Church. As a historical landmark in Kimberley, the Trinity Methodist Church complex is of compact design.	Kimberley, CBD	Kimberley	Provincial Heritage Site	28°44′21″S 24°45′55″E	The external detail is Gothic. The fine red brick is typically 'Church and McLauchlin'. During the early 19th century, the Methodist congregation was supported by a group of people willing Type of site: Church Current use: Religious: Church. As a historical landmark in Kimberley, the Trinity Methodist Church complex is of compact design.
9/2/049/0109	Nazareth House, Cornwall Street, Kimberley	Double storey building with hipped iron roof with wooden terminals. In 1888 five sisters arrived in Kimberley from London and opened Nazareth House to care for the aged and Type of site: House Current use: Residential. Intrinsic architectural and cultural significance. Nazareth House is the oldest charity and work in Kimberley. Founded by the Sisters of Nazareth in 1888, the complex has played a historic role in tending the infirm and needy in Kimberley.	Kimberley	Kimberley	Register	28°44′53″S 24°46′31″E	Upload Photo
9/2/049/0118	Kiddie House, 11 Currey Street, Kimberley	Fine double storey facebrick house with timber verandah. It has a corrugated iron roof. Andrew Cameron Kiddie emigrated to S.A in 1885. Type of site: House Previous use: Residential. Current use: Commercial – Restaurant. Kiddie House is an excellent example of architecture in the early twentieth century.	Kimberley, CBD	Kimberley	Provincial Heritage Site	28°44′27″S 24°45′48″E	Upload Photo
9/2/049/0120-001	5 Foley Street, Kimberley	House with hipped roof, now tiled, with hipped gablets over two bay windows. Tiled verandah. Type of site: House Current use: Residential.	Kimberley, Belgravia	Kimberley	Register	28°44′40″S 24°46′41″E	Upload Photo
9/2/049/0120-002	56 Milner Street, Kimberley	Hipped roof, projecting covered gable on left. Gable decorated has a rectangular bay. Verandah runs a Type of site: House Current use: Residential. Intrinsic architectural and cultural significance.	Kimberley	Kimberley	Register	28°45′11″S 24°46′17″E	Upload Photo
9/2/049/0120-003	59 Milner Street, Kimberley	Hipped roof, verandah composed of 3 curved bays with precast columns, enclosed with fine mesh screen. Type of site: House Current use: Residential. Intrinsic architectural and cultural significance.	Kimberley	Kimberley	Register	28°45′14″S 24°46′16″E	Upload Photo
9/2/049/0120-004	5 Park Road, Kimberley	House with hipped roof and convex verandah on double timber columns on two sides. Type of site: House Current use: Residential.	Kimberley, Belgravia	Kimberley	Register	28°44′33″S 24°46′16″E	Upload Photo
9/2/049/0120-005	47 Milner Street, Kimberley	Edwardian, hipped roof and verandah on precast columns with extensions at the side. Type of site: House Current use: Residential. Intrinsic architectural and cultural significance.	Kimberley	Kimberley	Register	28°45′11″S 24°46′21″E	Upload Photo
9/2/049/0120-006	36 Milner Street, Kimberley	Hipped roof and tall facebrick chimney. Facade symmetrical, central arched, recessed porch. Type of site: House Current use: Residential. Intrinsic architectural and cultural significance.	Kimberley	Kimberley	Register	28°45′07″S 24°46′22″E	Upload Photo
9/2/049/0120-007	1 Foley Street, Kimberley	House with hipped roof, gables on two sides and bullnose verandah on precast columns. Front Type of site: House Current use: Residential.	Kimberley, Belgravia	Kimberley	Register	28°44′40″S 24°46′39″E	Upload Photo
9/2/049/0120-008	32 Milner Street, Kimberley	Painted facebrick house with hipped roof and projecting gable with tall finial, timber ornamentation. Type of site: House. Current use: Residential. Intrinsic architectural and cultural significance.	Kimberley	Kimberley	Register	28°45′06″S 24°46′23″E	Upload Photo
9/2/049/0120-009	15 Rendlesham Road, Kimberley	House with half-hipped roof and verandah on precast columns, now tiled. French doors. Type of site: House. Current use: Residential. Intrinsic architectural and cultural significance.	Kimberley, Belgravia	Kimberley	Register	28°44′40″S 24°46′43″E	Upload Photo
9/2/049/0120-010	18 Milner Street, Kimberley	Half-hipped, cast iron cresting, decorated gablet ventilator & tall chimney, moulded plasterwork. Type of site: House. Current use: Residential. Intrinsic architectural and cultural significance.	Kimberley	Kimberley	Register	28°45′00″S 24°46′29″E	Upload Photo
9/2/049/0120-011	Esmonde, 3 Loch Road, Kimberley	House with hipped roof and bullnose verandah on two sides on painted facebrick columns. Type of site: House. Current use: Residential.	Kimberley, Belgravia	Kimberley	Register	28°44′46″S 24°46′32″E	Upload Photo
9/2/049/0120-012	42 Synagogue Street, Kimberley	Facebrick Arts and Crafts style cottage, half-timbered projecting gable and gablet. Type of site: House Current use: Residential. Intrinsic architectural and cultural significance.	Kimberley	Kimberley	Register	28°45′01″S 24°46′24″E	Upload Photo
9/2/049/0120-013	5 Lodge Road, Kimberley	Cape Dutch revival building, holbol end, front gables. Bullnose verandah, double timber columns. Type of site: House. Current use: Residential.	Kimberley	Kimberley	Register	28°44′47″S 24°46′43″E	Upload Photo
9/2/049/0120-014	12 Park Road, Kimberley	House with hipped roof and concavo/convex verandah on precast columns. Door with quoins. Type of site: House. Current use: Residential.	Kimberley, Belgravia	Kimberley	Register	28°44′38″S 24°46′20″E	Upload Photo
9/2/049/0120-015	3 Harley Street, Kimberley	House with hipped roof and two decorated gablets over bay windows. Bullnose verandah with timber columns. Type of site: House. Current use: Residential.	Kimberley, Belgravia	Kimberley	Register	28°44′41″S 24°46′33″E	Upload Photo
9/2/049/0120-017	21 Milner Street, Kimberley	Hipped roof, two bays with hipped roofs and sash windows. The central front door has side- and fanliites. Type of site: House Current use: Residential. Intrinsic architectural and cultural significance.	Kimberley	Kimberley	Register	28°45′03″S 24°46′30″E	Upload Photo
9/2/049/0120-018	7 Egerton Road, Kimberley	Facebrick house, hipped roof with cast iron terminals, a projecting covered gable. Bullnose verandah. Type of site: House. Current use: Residential. Intrinsic architectural and cultural significance.	Kimberley, Belgravia	Kimberley	Register	28°44′55″S 24°46′46″E	Upload Photo
9/2/049/0120-019	8 Carrington Road, Kimberley	Long house with hipped roof and verandah roof continuous with main roof, hipped at the ends. Type of site: House Current use: Residential. Intrinsic architectural and cultural significance.	Kimberley	Kimberley	Register	28°45′00″S 24°46′36″E	Upload Photo
9/2/049/0120-020	13 Spencer Street, Kimberley	Facebrick house with concavo/convexo verandah on precast columns. 4-panel door steel windows. Type of site: House. Current use: Residential. Intrinsic architectural and cultural significance.	Kimberley	Kimberley	Register	28°44′43″S 24°46′27″E	Upload Photo
9/2/049/0120-021	1 Loch Road, Kimberley	Facebrick house with half-hipped roof and verandah roof continuous with main roof, on precast columns. Type of site: House. Current use: Residential.	Kimberley, Belgravia	Kimberley	Register	28°44′47″S 24°46′30″E	Upload Photo
9/2/049/0120-022	6 Carrington Road, Kimberley	Hipped roof, turret vent, verandah on 3 sides with precast columns and moulded plaster balustrade. Type of site: House Current use: Residential. Intrinsic architectural and cultural significance.	Kimberley	Kimberley	Register	28°45′00″S 24°46′37″E	Upload Photo
9/2/049/0120-023	1 Smith Street, Kimberley	House, hipped roof, projecting gable decorated with detailed fretwork, half round vent & string. Type of site: House Current use: Residential. Intrinsic architectural and cultural significance.	Kimberley, Belgravia	Kimberley	Register	28°44′37″S 24°46′42″E	Upload Photo
9/2/049/0120-024	8 Salisbury Street, Kimberley	Facebrick house, hipped roof, recessed verandah on turned timber columns with small brackets. Type of site: House. Current use: Residential. Intrinsic architectural and cultural significance.	Kimberley, Belgravia	Kimberley	Register	28°44′48″S 24°46′37″E	Upload Photo
9/2/049/0120-025	3 Salisbury Street, Kimberley	House with hipped roof and bullnose verandah on three sides, with precast columns. Steel windows. Type of site: House Current use: Residential. Intrinsic architectural and cultural significance.	Kimberley, Belgravia	Kimberley	Register	28°44′48″S 24°46′35″E	Upload Photo
9/2/049/0120-026	28 Rendlesham Road, Kimberley	House with half-hipped roof and two covered gables with plaster string courses. Bullnose verandah. Type of site: House. Current use: Residential. Intrinsic architectural and cultural significance.	Kimberley, Belgravia	Kimberley	Register	28°44′42″S 24°46′43″E	Upload Photo
9/2/049/0120-027	22 Rendlesham Road, Kimberley	House with half-hipped roof continuous with main roof, on masonry columns. Wide front door. Type of site: House Current use: Residential. Intrinsic architectural and cultural significance.	Kimberley, Belgravia	Kimberley	Register	28°44′44″S 24°46′42″E	Upload Photo
9/2/049/0120-028	19 Park Road, Kimberley	Double storey house with central projecting covered gable with round vent. Double storey verandah. Type of site: House. Current use: Residential. Intrinsic architectural and cultural significance	Kimberley, Belgravia	Kimberley	Register	28°44′41″S 24°46′28″E	Double storey house with central projecting covered gable with round vent. Double storey verandah. Type of site: House. Current use: Residential. Intrinsic architectural and cultural significance
9/2/049/0120-030	2 Loch Road, Kimberley	Large house with decorated gables on two sides. Wrap around verandah on plastered brick columns. Type of site: House. Current use: Residential.	Kimberley, Belgravia	Kimberley	Register	28°44′47″S 24°46′34″E	Upload Photo
9/2/049/0120-035	7 Carrington Road, Kimberley		Kimberley	Kimberley	Register	28°45′04″S 24°46′37″E	Upload Photo
9/2/049/0120-036	Cenotaph, Spencer Street, Kimberley	Surrounded by cypress trees, lawn and plant beds. Designed by Timlin, partner of Greatbatch, and erected in 1928 to honour 400 men who died in the fire. Type of site: Memorial. Current use: Memorial. Intrinsic architectural and cultural significance.	Kimberley	Kimberley	Register	28°44′44″S 24°46′29″E	Upload Photo
9/2/049/0120-045	16 Milner Street, Kimberley	Hipped roof and 2 covered gables. Front gable has cast iron barge fret, round, louvred vent. Type of site: House Current use: Residential. Intrinsic architectural and cultural significance.	Kimberley	Kimberley	Register	28°45′00″S 24°46′30″E	Upload Photo
9/2/049/0120-046	30 Park Road, Kimberley	House with hipped roof and recessed verandah on wooden columns. Door flanked by bays with French door. Type of site: House Current use: Residential. Intrinsic architectural and cultural significance.	Kimberley, Belgravia	Kimberley	Register	28°44′34″S 24°46′36″E	Upload Photo
9/2/049/0120-047	184 Dutoitspan Road, Kimberley	House with hipped roof and concavo-convex verandah on two sides with pillars. Panelled front door. Type of site: House Current use: Residential. Intrinsic architectural and cultural significance.	Kimberley	Kimberley	Register	28°44′37″S 24°46′15″E	Upload Photo
9/2/049/0120-049	20 Park Road, Kimberley	House with hipped roof and concavo/convex verandah on 3 sides, with masonry pillars. Double door. Type of site: House Current use: Residential. Intrinsic architectural and cultural significance.	Kimberley, Belgravia	Kimberley	Register	28°44′42″S 24°46′29″E	Upload Photo
9/2/049/0120-050	14 Milner Street, Kimberley	Half-hipped iron roof, projecting gables on both street sides. Bullnose verandah on precast columns. Type of site: House Current use: Residential. Intrinsic architectural and cultural significance.	Kimberley	Kimberley	Register	28°44′59″S 24°46′31″E	Upload Photo
9/2/049/0120-051	23 Park Road, Kimberley	House with hipped roof and verandah on precast columns, both now tiled. Verandah partly closed. Type of site: House Current use: Residential. Intrinsic architectural and cultural significance.	Kimberley, Belgravia	Kimberley	Register	28°44′40″S 24°46′34″E	Upload Photo
9/2/049/0120-053	29 Park Road, Kimberley	House with hipped roof and projecting decorated gable with bay window. Verandah on masonry pillars. Type of site: House Current use: Residential. Intrinsic architectural and cultural significance.	Kimberley, Belgravia	Kimberley	Register	28°44′35″S 24°46′36″E	Upload Photo
9/2/049/0120-055	71 Milner Street, Kimberley	Hipped roof, central projecting porch with holbol gable and arched openings. Teak front door. Type of site: House Current use: Residential. Intrinsic architectural and cultural significance.	Kimberley	Kimberley	Register	28°45′16″S 24°46′11″E	Upload Photo
9/2/049/0120-056	8 Dalham Road, Kimberley	Half-hipped roof & projecting covered gable with bay reaching the eaves. Verandah on precast columns. Type of site: House Current use: Residential. Intrinsic architectural and cultural significance.	Kimberley	Kimberley	Register	28°44′56″S 24°46′00″E	Upload Photo
9/2/049/0120-057	3 Carrington Road, Kimberley	U-shaped house with hipped, tiled roof and wooden casements with louvred shutters, probably dating from the 1930s. Type of site: House Current use: Residential. Intrinsic architectural and cultural significance.	Kimberley	Kimberley	Register	28°45′02″S 24°46′39″E	Upload Photo
9/2/049/0120-058	4 Carrington Road, Kimberley	House with hipped roof and recessed verandah with precast columns. 4-panel front door with side-lites. Type of site: House. Current use: Residential. Intrinsic architectural and cultural significance.	Kimberley	Kimberley	Register	28°44′59″S 24°46′38″E	Upload Photo
9/2/049/0120-059	5 Carrington Road, Kimberley	Cape Dutch revival style house with half-hipped roof and two holbol gables. Steel windows with louvres. Type of site: House Current use: Residential. Intrinsic architectural and cultural significance.	Kimberley	Kimberley	Register	28°45′03″S 24°46′38″E	Upload Photo
9/2/049/0120-060	17 Milner Street, Kimberley	Hipped iron roof, two bay windows under own hipped roof Verandah has facebrick columns. Type of site: House Current use: Residential. Intrinsic architectural and cultural significance.	Kimberley	Kimberley	Register	28°45′02″S 24°46′31″E	Upload Photo
9/2/049/0120-061	24 Park Road, Kimberley	House with hipped roof and verandah on three sides, with masonry pillars and two plain gablets. Type of site: House Current use: Residential. Intrinsic architectural and cultural significance.	Kimberley, Belgravia	Kimberley	Register	28°44′40″S 24°46′35″E	Upload Photo
9/2/049/0120-063	3 Elsmere Road, Kimberley	Hipped roof, central decorated covered gablet over entrance. Verandah on precast columns.Type of site: House. Current use: Residential.	Kimberley, Belgravia	Kimberley	Register	28°44′51″S 24°46′38″E	Upload Photo
9/2/049/0120-064	2 Elsmere Road, Kimberley	House with hipped roof and bullnose verandah on three sides, on brick columns. Casement windows. Type of site: House. Current use: Residential.	Kimberley, Belgravia	Kimberley	Register	28°44′48″S 24°46′32″E	Upload Photo
9/2/049/0120-065	Old Bishop's Hostel, Kimberley Boys' High School, Memorial Road, Kimberley	Single storey with facebrick plinth and pilaster, steel windows. Ornate plastered gable over entrance. Type of site: School. Current use: Residential: Hostel.	Kimberley	Kimberley	Register	28°46′22″S 24°44′50″E	Upload Photo
9/2/049/0120-066	8 Egerton Road, Kimberley	House with concavo/convex verandah roof continuous with main roof, and two small gables above. Type of site: House Current use: Residential. Intrinsic architectural and cultural significance.	Kimberley, Belgravia	Kimberley	Register	28°44′56″S 24°46′49″E	Upload Photo
9/2/049/0120-067	23 Milner Street, Kimberley	Steeply-pitched roof and 3 covered gables, one at the corner. Each gable has louvred vent. 2 of the Type of site: House Current use: Residential. Intrinsic architectural and cultural significance.	Kimberley	Kimberley	Register	28°45′03″S 24°46′29″E	Upload Photo
9/2/049/0120-068	4 Belgrave Road, Kimberley	Facebrick house with two covered gables and the verandah roof continuous with the main roof. Type of site: House. Current use: Residential.	Kimberley, Belgravia	Kimberley	Register	28°44′33″S 24°46′37″E	Upload Photo
9/2/049/0120-070	25 Milner Street, Kimberley	Facebrick Arts and Crafts style cottage with a complex corrugated iron roof with covered gables. Type of site: House Current use: Residential Intrinsic architectural and cultural significance.	Kimberley	Kimberley	Register	28°45′04″S 24°46′28″E	Upload Photo
9/2/049/0120-072	15 Dalham Road, Kimberley	Painted brick, pitched roof And projecting gables on 2 sides. Front gable decorated, has bay window. Type of site: House Current use: Residential. Intrinsic architectural and cultural significance.	Kimberley	Kimberley	Register – Query	28°44′56″S 24°46′04″E	Upload Photo
9/2/049/0120-075	3 Egerton Road, Kimberley	House with two covered gables and verandah on masonry supports between. Door in arched recess. Type of site: House Current use: Residential. Intrinsic architectural and cultural significance.	Kimberley, Belgravia	Kimberley	Register	28°44′56″S 24°46′44″E	Upload Photo
9/2/049/0120-077	17 Egerton Road, Kimberley	House with half hipped roof and classical style verandah with pedimented projecting entrance. Type of site: House. Current use: Residential.	Kimberley, Belgravia	Kimberley	Register	28°44′48″S 24°46′53″E	Upload Photo
9/2/049/0120-085	19 Egerton Road, Kimberley	Facebrick, projecting covered gables at each end, collar beam & finial, arched, louverd vents. Type of site: House. Current use: Residential.	Kimberley, Belgravia	Kimberley	Register	28°44′47″S 24°46′55″E	Upload Photo
9/2/049/0120-087	22 Milner Street, Kimberley	Half-hipped iron roof and bay windows with sashes on either side of Victorian front door. Type of site: House. Current use: Residential. Intrinsic architectural and cultural significance.	Kimberley	Kimberley	Register	28°45′02″S 24°46′28″E	Upload Photo
9/2/049/0120-088	21 Egerton Road, Kimberley	House with half-hipped roof and large central projecting gable with semi-circular vent. Type of site: House. Current use: Residential.	Kimberley, Belgravia	Kimberley	Register	28°44′45″S 24°46′56″E	Upload Photo
9/2/049/0120-089	5 Egerton Road, Kimberley	Modernised house, tiled roof and steel windows. Door with arched panels and side- and fanlights. Type of site: House Current use: Residential. Intrinsic architectural and cultural significance.	Kimberley, Belgravia	Kimberley	Register	28°44′54″S 24°46′47″E	Upload Photo
9/2/049/0120-090	15 Milner Street, Kimberley	L, shaped with saddle roof. Covered gables are decorated and have tall finials. Bay windows with louvres. Type of site: House Current use: Residential. Intrinsic architectural and cultural significance.	Kimberley	Kimberley	Register	28°45′01″S 24°46′32″E	Upload Photo
9/2/049/0120-092	26 Carrington Road, Kimberley	Facebrick house with hipped roof. Verandah with precast columns and stoepkamer. Type of site: House. Current use: Residential. Intrinsic architectural and cultural significance.	Kimberley	Kimberley	Register	28°45′07″S 24°46′28″E	Upload Photo
9/2/049/0120-093	28 Carrington Road, Kimberley	This house has half-hipped roof with an extension at the side. Bullnose verandah on precast columns. Type of site: House. Current use: Residential. Intrinsic architectural and cultural significance.	Kimberley	Kimberley	Register	28°45′08″S 24°46′27″E	Upload Photo
9/2/049/0120-094	10 Milner Street, Kimberley	Half-hipped roof with louvred vent now tiled as well as verandah on precast columns wraps. Type of site: House. Current use: Residential. Intrinsic architectural and cultural significance.	Kimberley	Kimberley	Register	28°44′58″S 24°46′32″E	Upload Photo
9/2/049/0120-095	9 Milner Street, Kimberley	Half-hipped iron roof with long gabled wing on left and a protruding gable on right. Bullnose veranda. Type of site: House. Current use: Residential. Intrinsic architectural and cultural significance.	Kimberley	Kimberley	Register	28°44′59″S 24°46′34″E	Upload Photo
9/2/049/0120-096	6 Milner Street, Kimberley	Facebrick Saddle roof, projecting gable. Gable decorated, has a plastered bay window, casements. Type of site: House. Current use: Residential.	Kimberley	Kimberley	Register	28°44′57″S 24°46′34″E	Upload Photo
9/2/049/0120-097	52 Synagogue Street, Kimberley	House with half hipped roof with finials. Covered gable over triangular bay and gablet. Type of site: House. Current use: Residential. Intrinsic architectural and cultural significance.	Kimberley	Kimberley	Register	28°45′03″S 24°46′27″E	Upload Photo
9/2/049/0120-098	50 Synagogue Street, Kimberley	House with iron roof and gable projecting over triangular bay with louvred vent, string course. Type of site: House Current use: Residential. Intrinsic architectural and cultural significance.	Kimberley	Kimberley	Register	28°45′03″S 24°46′26″E	Upload Photo
9/2/049/0120-099	46a Carrington Road, Kimberley	Baker-style house with tiled roof and tall chimneys. Central portion of facade recessed to form entrance. Type of site: House Current use: Residential. Intrinsic architectural and cultural significance.	Kimberley	Kimberley	Register	28°45′18″S 24°46′17″E	Upload Photo
9/2/049/0120-100	4 Milner Street, Kimberley	Cottage with half hipped iron roof. Concavo/Convex verandah on brick columns has a gablet over the entry. Type of site: House. Current use: Residential. Intrinsic architectural and cultural significance.	Kimberley	Kimberley	Register	28°44′56″S 24°46′34″E	Upload Photo
9/2/049/0120-101	40 Carrington Road, Kimberley	Large Victorian house with half-hipped roof with two turret ventilators. Projecting gable with bay. Type of site: House. Current use: Residential. Intrinsic architectural and cultural significance.	Kimberley	Kimberley	Register	28°45′13″S 24°46′22″E	Upload Photo
9/2/049/0120-102	38 Carrington Road, Kimberley	Hipped tiled roof, tall facebrick chimneys. Central portion of front facade is recessed. Designed by Sir Herbert Baker in 1904 Type of site: House. Current use: Residential. Intrinsic architectural and cultural significance.	Kimberley	Kimberley	Register	28°45′12″S 24°46′23″E	Upload Photo
9/2/049/0120-103	36 Carrington Road, Kimberley	Hipped roof, continuous verandah roof, now tiled. Plastered brick columns to verandah. Three bay windows. Type of site: House. Current use: Residential. Intrinsic architectural and cultural significance.	Kimberley	Kimberley	Register	28°45′11″S 24°46′24″E	Upload Photo
9/2/049/0120-104	34 Carrington Road, Kimberley	Victorian house with hipped roof and projecting covered gable with bay window with multiple steel casements. Type of site: House. Current use: Residential. Intrinsic architectural and cultural significance.	Kimberley	Kimberley	Register	28°45′10″S 24°46′25″E	Upload Photo
9/2/049/0120-105	32 Carrington Road, Kimberley	Half-hipped roof, covered gable over bay window, decorated with ornamental plaster. Type of site: House. Current use: Residential. Intrinsic architectural and cultural significance.	Kimberley	Kimberley	Register	28°45′09″S 24°46′26″E	Upload Photo
9/2/049/0120-106	12 Elsmere Road, Kimberley	House with projecting gable with bay and concavo/convex verandah on two sides with brick and pipe columns. Type of site: House. Current use: Residential.	Kimberley, Belgravia	Kimberley	Register	28°44′51″S 24°46′35″E	Upload Photo
9/2/049/0120-107	2 Milner Street, Kimberley	House with hipped iron roof and central louvred gablet with finial. Verandah is bullnosed. Type of site: House. Current use: Residential. Intrinsic architectural and cultural significance.	Kimberley	Kimberley	Register	28°44′55″S 24°46′35″E	Upload Photo
9/2/049/0120-109	30 Milner Street, Kimberley	Facebrick house with half-hipped roof and projecting, decorated gable with bay window. Type of site: House Current use: Residential. Intrinsic architectural and cultural significance.	Kimberley	Kimberley	Register	28°45′06″S 24°46′24″E	Upload Photo
9/2/049/0120-110	20 Milner Street, Kimberley	Facebrick house with half-hipped iron roof, with ventilator finial. The verandah has timber columns. Type of site: House. Current use: Residential. Intrinsic architectural and cultural significance.	Kimberley	Kimberley	Register	28°45′01″S 24°46′29″E	Upload Photo
9/2/049/0120-111	Dalham House, 17 Dalham Road, Kimberley	Edwardian house, half-hipped roof, decorated vent & 2 decorated gables over bay windows. Type of site: House. Current use: Residential. Intrinsic architectural and cultural significance.	Kimberley	Kimberley	Register	28°44′57″S 24°46′04″E	Upload Photo
9/2/049/0120-112	12 Carrington Road, Kimberley	House with hipped roof and two decorated covered gables over triangular bays, with louvred vents. Type of site: House. Current use: Residential. Intrinsic architectural and cultural significance.	Kimberley	Kimberley	Register	28°45′02″S 24°46′34″E	Upload Photo
9/2/049/0120-113	30 Carrington Road, Kimberley	Facebrick house with half-hipped roof with two decorative gables. Verandah on precast columns. Wooden Type of site: House. Current use: Residential. Intrinsic architectural and cultural significance.	Kimberley	Kimberley	Register	28°45′09″S 24°46′27″E	Upload Photo
9/2/049/0120-114	15 Carrington Road, Kimberley	Cape Dutch revival style house with tiled roof and two ornate holbol gables with oriel windows. Type of site: House. Current use: Residential. Intrinsic architectural and cultural significance.	Kimberley	Kimberley	Register	28°45′08″S 24°46′32″E	Upload Photo
9/2/049/0120-115	13 Milner Street, Kimberley	Half-hipped roof, now tiled, verandah roof continuous. Protruding gable on Milner Street side. Type of site: House. Current use: Residential. Intrinsic architectural and cultural significance.	Kimberley	Kimberley	Register	28°45′01″S 24°46′33″E	Upload Photo
9/2/049/0120-116	17 Carrington Road, Kimberley	House with hipped roof and wings at 45 degrees at each corner, with straight gables. Type of site: House. Current use: Residential. Intrinsic architectural and cultural significance.	Kimberley	Kimberley	Register	28°45′04″S 24°46′37″E	Upload Photo
9/2/049/0120-117	18 Carrington Road, Kimberley	House with two covered gables with finials and collar beams. Bullnose verandah on precast columns. Type of site: House. Current use: Residential. Intrinsic architectural and cultural significance.	Kimberley	Kimberley	Register	28°45′04″S 24°46′32″E	Upload Photo
9/2/049/0120-118	3 Milner Street, Kimberley	House with half hipped iron roof with glazed vents and bullnose vernandah on two sides. Type of site: House. Current use: Residential. Intrinsic architectural and cultural significance.	Kimberley	Kimberley	Register	28°44′58″S 24°46′36″E	Upload Photo
9/2/049/0120-119	22 Carrington Road, Kimberley	Complex half-hipped roof, decorated vents and tall chimneys. Octagonal tower on the corner. Type of site: House. Current use: Residential. Intrinsic architectural and cultural significance.	Kimberley	Kimberley	Register	28°45′06″S 24°46′30″E	Upload Photo
9/2/049/0120-120	24 Carrington Road, Kimberley	House with hipped roof and two decorated gables over bays. Bullnose verandah with precast columns. Type of site: House. Current use: Residential. Intrinsic architectural and cultural significance.	Kimberley	Kimberley	Register	28°45′06″S 24°46′29″E	Upload Photo
9/2/049/0120-121	14 Elsmere Road, Kimberley	2 Sections.1. hipped roof with turret vent, verandah on 2 sides, with stoepkamer at right side. Type of site: House. Current use: Residential.	Kimberley, Belgravia	Kimberley	Register	28°44′51″S 24°46′37″E	Upload Photo
9/2/049/0120-122	14 Carrington Road, Kimberley	Saddle roof, off center covered, decorated gable, louvred vent & a bay, steel windows. Type of site: House. Current use: Residential. Intrinsic architectural and cultural significance.	Kimberley	Kimberley	Register	28°45′03″S 24°46′34″E	Upload Photo
9/2/049/0121	Grave of Solomon T Plaatje, West End Cemetery, Kimberley	Type of site: Grave.	Kimberley	Kimberley	Provincial Heritage Site	28°44′00″S 24°44′28″E	Upload Photo
9/2/049/0127	186 Du Toitspan Road, Kimberley	House with half hipped roof with decorated gablets. Bullnose verandah on three sides with timber columns. Type of site: House. Current use: Residential. Intrinsic architectural and cultural significance.	Kimberley	Kimberley	Register	28°44′56″S 24°46′37″E	Upload Photo
