= Elizabeth Anne Voigt =

South African museologist and zooarchaeologist

- Born: 26 April 1944; Cape Town, Union of South Africa
- Died: 7 April 2010 (aged 65); Kimberley, Northern Cape, South Africa
- Education: Rustenburg School for Girls
- Alma mater: University of Cape Town; University of Pretoria
- Scientific career
- Fields: Zooarchaeology
- Institutions: McGregor Museum

Elizabeth Anne Voigt (née Speed) was director of the McGregor Museum in Kimberley, South Africa, and, as an archaeozoologist, served a term as president of the South African Archaeological Society. In retirement, Voigt was appointed a research associate of the McGregor Museum. She was born in Cape Town on 26 April 1944 and died on 7 April 2010 in Kimberley.

== Education and early career ==
Voigt was born and brought up in Cape Town, where she attended the Rustenburg School for Girls in Rondebosch. Her undergraduate majors at the University of Cape Town were in archaeology, social anthropology and Latin. With a First Class archaeology Honours degree, she embarked on a career in which she would eventually specialise in the study of faunal remains from archaeological sites. She obtained her master's degree from the University of Pretoria.

== Archaeozoology ==
Voigt studied coastal molluscan fauna, particularly at Klasies River Mouth, and conducted ethnoarchaeological research on shellfish diets. The main thrust of Voigt's subsequent faunal work, however, was wide-ranging analysis of animal bones from Southern African Iron Age sites dating between A.D. 200 and 1800, and especially at Mapungubwe, with a focus on diet, economy and domesticated breeds. Her publications include both journal articles and a number of less formal pieces for popularising the findings of archaeozoology. Her Masters dissertation at University of Pretoria was published as a book by the Transvaal Museum under the title, Mapungubwe: an archaeozoological interpretation of an Iron Age community. Latterly Voigt analysed a number of assemblages from Karoo Later Stone Age and colonial era contexts.

== Museums ==
Apart from studying the diets, climates and economies revealed through the seashells and bones of the past, Voigt increasingly devoted attention to matters museological. While she held junior and part-time lectureships at the Universities of Cape Town and Pretoria, it was primarily in museums that she developed her subsequent career. She played an important role in the various activities of the South African Museums Association. In 1996 she and the staff at the McGregor Museum in Kimberley, of which she was appointed director in 1987, organised and hosted the Diamond Jubilee conference of the Association which had been founded in Kimberley sixty years previously. She served on the Council of the Association for several terms, was editor of its journal SAMAB, and was the hard-working chairman of its education committee. She played a vital role on the committee which promoted professional standards and produced the graded museum accreditation scheme for South Africa in 1996. From 1997 to 2003 she served as a trustee of Iziko Museums. Liz Voigt obtained a Nagraadse Diploma in Museologie from the University of Pretoria and also the diploma of the Museums Association of the United Kingdom. "Once museums get into your blood," she observed, "they are there for life."

== Archaeological Data Recording Centre ==
Earlier, she had helped set up the Archaeological Data Recording Centre at the South African Museum (1967–68), for which she also published The South African Archaeological Site Recording Manual. At the Transvaal Museum in Pretoria, where she worked from 1969 to 1987, initially in palaeontology, she established an Archaeozoology Department in 1981 – the first of its kind in Southern Africa.

== McGregor Museum ==
Subsequently, she built up a comparative osteology laboratory at the McGregor Museum. Her Kimberley career was primarily administrative, with major projects that she supervised including the opening of the restored Rudd House (1988), the completion of the new Humanities Block (1990), the declaration of Wonderwerk Cave as a National Monument and its opening with public displays (1993), the Northern Cape Frontiers and Ancestors Galleries at the McGregor Museum (1997–2000), the further development of Magersfontein for the Anglo-Boer War centenary (1999), the establishment of the Sol Plaatje Museum and opening both of the Barkly West Museum and new displays at Victoria West. In a period of momentous change in the immediate post-Apartheid era, Voigt went some way to negotiating transformation in the museum.

== Retirement ==
In retirement, Voigt returned to her first love, engaging in archaeological and archaeozoological projects alongside a continuing involvement in museums. Amongst these was a joint effort to research the little-known Black concentration camps that were set up in the Northern Cape during the Anglo-Boer War. She also carried out faunal analyses on assemblages from Swaziland, Botswana, the Karoo and nineteenth-century sites near Kimberley.

As president of the South African Archaeological Society, 2000–2002, Voigt sounded the alarm on diminishing museum capacity in archaeology. This was in her presidential address on Archaeology under siege: the dilemma of archaeology in museums in South Africa. A particular concern of hers was the creation of entry-level positions and qualifications for technicians in museums, an issue which she pursued when appointed as a member of South Africa's Qualifications Authority (SAQA) Standards Generating Body for Archaeology. Traditionally as centres for research and for engaging the public in displays and in other ways, museums most crucially fulfil a curational role for archaeological and other collections. This made museums a key sector, she maintained, under-girding archaeology as a going concern.

In the community, Voigt was actively involved in various spheres for the common good. She served as chairman of the St Cyprian's Guild and on the Council of St Cyprian's Cathedral in Kimberley, while Rotary honoured her with a Paul Harris Fellowship.
