= Richard Liversidge =

- Born: September 17, 1926; Blantyre, Malawi
- Died: September 15, 2003 (aged 76); Kimberley, Northern Cape

Richard Liversidge (1926-2003) was a naturalist, ornithologist and museum director. He was born on 17 September 1926 in Blantyre, Nyasaland (now Malawi), and died on 15 September 2003 in Kimberley, South Africa.

== Early career ==
In his childhood, Liversidge lived for various periods in India, Tanzania, Zambia and Zimbabwe, and it was as a schoolboy that his interest in birds originated. His initial training, however, was in engineering, when he was apprenticed as a fitter and turner. He began at the University of Cape Town, in engineering, in 1946. Working full-time as a technician at the university, he then commenced studies in zoology and botany, one subject a year, finally graduating in 1955. He took up an appointment as ornithologist at the Port Elizabeth Museum, where he began his study of the ecology of the Cape bulbul which he wrote up for a PhD.

Subsequently, Liversidge worked as a conservator with the Natal Parks Board.

Richard Liversidge was the first curator at the Tsitsikamma National Park on the south Cape coast.

== McGregor Museum, Kimberley ==
In June 1966, Richard Liversidge was appointed as Director of the McGregor Museum in Kimberley. This was a position he held until his retirement in 1986, whereafter he continued to serve the museum as a Research Associate and as a member of the Board of Trustees.

During Liversidge's directorship, the McGregor Museum underwent unprecedented growth. It was at this time that the museum acquired two important historic homes in Kimberley, The Bungalow (Rudd House) and Dunluce, while he was instrumental in developing the Magersfontein Battlefield Museum and Pioneers of Aviation Museum on the outskirts of Kimberley. The most significant project of this period was undoubtedly the moving of the museum's headquarters from Chapel Street in Kimberley (where the original 1907 building and an annexe added in the 1950s were hemmed in by buildings in the city's commercial centre, constraining opportunities for expansion) to the Sanatorium, a rambling building in Belgravia, adjacent to the Duggan-Cronin Gallery, where there was much space for future additions of offices and laboratories for a constantly augmented staff and, crucially, of store-rooms for the museums growing collections.

The move from Chapel Street took place gradually through 1973 and 1974, with the Sanatorium being officially opened as the McGregor Museum's headquarters on 22 November 1976.

Liversidge's interest in history also ensured that what had been primarily a natural history museum came to be recognised, as significantly, for its humanities collections (with important holdings particularly of historical papers, photographs and textiles).

== Publications ==
Liversidge published more than 80 scientific papers and 40 articles in a variety of journals on botany, ecology, ornithology, mammals, and history. A major contribution was as co-author, with Geoff McLachlan, of the first (1957) and subsequent three revisions of the Birds of South Africa, originally published by Austin Roberts in 1940.

Later, he wrote A Rapid Bird Guide (1978) and The Birds Around Us (1990), using the fine watercolour paintings of birds by Kimberley artist Jill Adams. The latter comprises almost a thousand accurately detailed and realistically coloured paintings of sitting, standing, swimming and flying birds. The main section of the book is divided into 15 habitats.

He was a co-author of several other books on history and game management.

== Liversidge's pipits and springbok research ==
A major achievement in Richard Liversidge's ornithological career was the identification and description of two new species of pipit, the long-tailed pipit (Anthus longicaudatus) and, together with Gary Voelker, the Kimberley pipit (Anthus pseudosimilis).

He also carried out long-term work on the ecology of the springbok, and had the remarkable ability to predict rain, almost to the day, based on his observation of springbok behaviour.

== Other interests and involvements ==
A member of several historical and game farmers' societies and associations, his interests covered a wide range of subjects.

Liversidge was a founder member of the Historical Society of Kimberley and the Northern Cape (which he referred to as the Hysterical Society), serving as chairman over many years. Several of the society's publications were brought out at his instigation.

Passionate about old buildings, Liversidge served on the National Monuments Council for 14 years from 1977 and was a recipient of the Cape Times Centenary Medal (1990) for outstanding achievements in the conservation of historical buildings.

He served also on the councils of the Zoological Society of South Africa and the Wild Life Management Association. He was the last surviving founding member of the Cape Bird Club, the Western Cape branch of BirdLife South Africa.

His contributions to natural history were recognized in 1994 when he was made a Fellow of the Linnean Society of London. He was elected a Corresponding Fellow of the American Ornithologists' Union in 1974 and an Honorary Fellow in 1991. He was made a Fellow of the South African Museums Association in 1996. Other awards were for Game Conservation in Cape Province (1976), a Merit Award from the Northern Cape Game Ranchers' Association (1990), a Lifetime Achiever Award from the Kimberley Publicity Association (2002) and an Annual Scroll and (posthumous) Gold Medal from the Wildlife and Environment Society of South Africa (2002).

Liversidge was a long-time member of the Rotary Club of Kimberley (part of the worldwide service organisation Rotary International), serving as its president in 1976/77. Through Rotary he made significant contributions to the Kimberley, South African and International communities. In 1991 he was made a Paul Harris Fellow in recognition of his services to Rotary and to the community.

== Memorials and commemorations ==
- A special memorial issue of Ostrich: the Journal of African Ornithology (Volume 75 No 4) was published in December 2004 in honour and memory of Dr Liversidge. It was edited by Mark Anderson and included a dedication by N.F. Oppenheimer of De Beers.
- An inscribed stone is the centre-piece of the Richard Liversidge Memorial Garden at the McGregor Museum.
- The Kimberley Historical Society inaugurated an annual Richard Liversidge Memorial Lecture, which is presented at the society's Annual General Meeting.
