= Rustenburg School for Girls =

Coordinates: 33°57′24.08″S 18°28′43.88″E

Rustenburg Schools for Girls

Location
- 44 Campground Road, Rosebank (High). Main Road, Rondebosch (junior); Cape Town, Western Cape; South Africa

Information
- School type: All-girls public (fee-paying) school
- Motto: palmam qui meruit ferat
- Established: 1894; 132 years ago
- School district: District 9
- School number: 021 686 4066
- Headmaster: B. Peterson (junior); M. Gates (high)
- Grades: R–12
- Gender: Female
- Age: 5 to 18
- Enrollment: 350 (junior); 863 (high school)
- Language: English
- Schedule: 08:00–15:00
- Campus: Urban Campus
- Campus type: Suburban
- Colours: Blue & navy
- Nickname: RGHS/RGJS
- Rivals: Herschel Girls School; Wynberg Girls' High School; Rhenish Girls' High School
- Accreditation: Western Cape Education Department
- High School Houses: Corvus Cygnus Lacerta Lepus Pavo
- Junior School Houses: Wiener, Cambridge, Innes and Michael
- 2022 Fees (high): R53,000 – R59,000 pa (tuition); R62,939 pa (boarding)
- 2022 Fees (junior): R42,645 pa
- Brother School: Rondebosch Boys' High School
- Website: rustenburggirls.org.za

Rustenburg Girls' High School and Rustenburg Girls' Junior School are two separate public (fee-paying) schools with a shared history, originating in the suburb of Rondebosch in Cape Town, South Africa. Rustenburg was founded in 1894 and divided into separate junior and high schools in 1932.

== History ==
The school was founded in 1894 in the historic Rustenburg House, which dates from the early years of the Dutch settlement at the Cape In 1932, the school was divided into two schools, and the high school moved into its new buildings on Erinville Estate and Charlie's Hope in the suburb of Rosebank, while the junior school remained in Rustenburg House on Main Road, Rondebosch. Charlie's Hope was subsequently demolished in 1976, before being rebuilt closer to the school. Erinville is now the name of the High School's boarding house. Rustenburg House was declared a National Monument in 1941.

Headmistresses of the Combined School:

- Miss Alicia Bleby, 1894–1911
- Miss Jean Donaldson-Wright, 1912–1916
- Miss Caroline Kemp, 1916–1933

Principals of the High School:

- Miss Caroline Kemp, 1933–1936
- Miss Gwen Hazell, 1937–1951
- Miss Margaret Thomson, 1952–1979
- Mrs Josephine McIntyre, 1980–1991
- Mrs Mary van Blerk, 1991–1999
- Dr Elizabeth Fullard, 1999–2006
- Mrs Susan Schnetler (Acting), 2006-2007
- Ms Laura Bekker, 2007–2015
- Mrs Susan Schnetler (Acting), 2016
- Mr Michael Gates, 2017–present

Headmistresses of the Junior School:

- Miss Marion Roper, 1933–1944
- Miss Zoë Orton, 1945–1967
- Mrs Ruth Jones, 1968–1977
- Miss Hazel Lentin, 1978–1998
- Mrs Joyce Conway, 1998–2007
- Mrs Di Berry, 2008–2018
- Mrs Belinda Petersen, 2019–present

== Academics ==
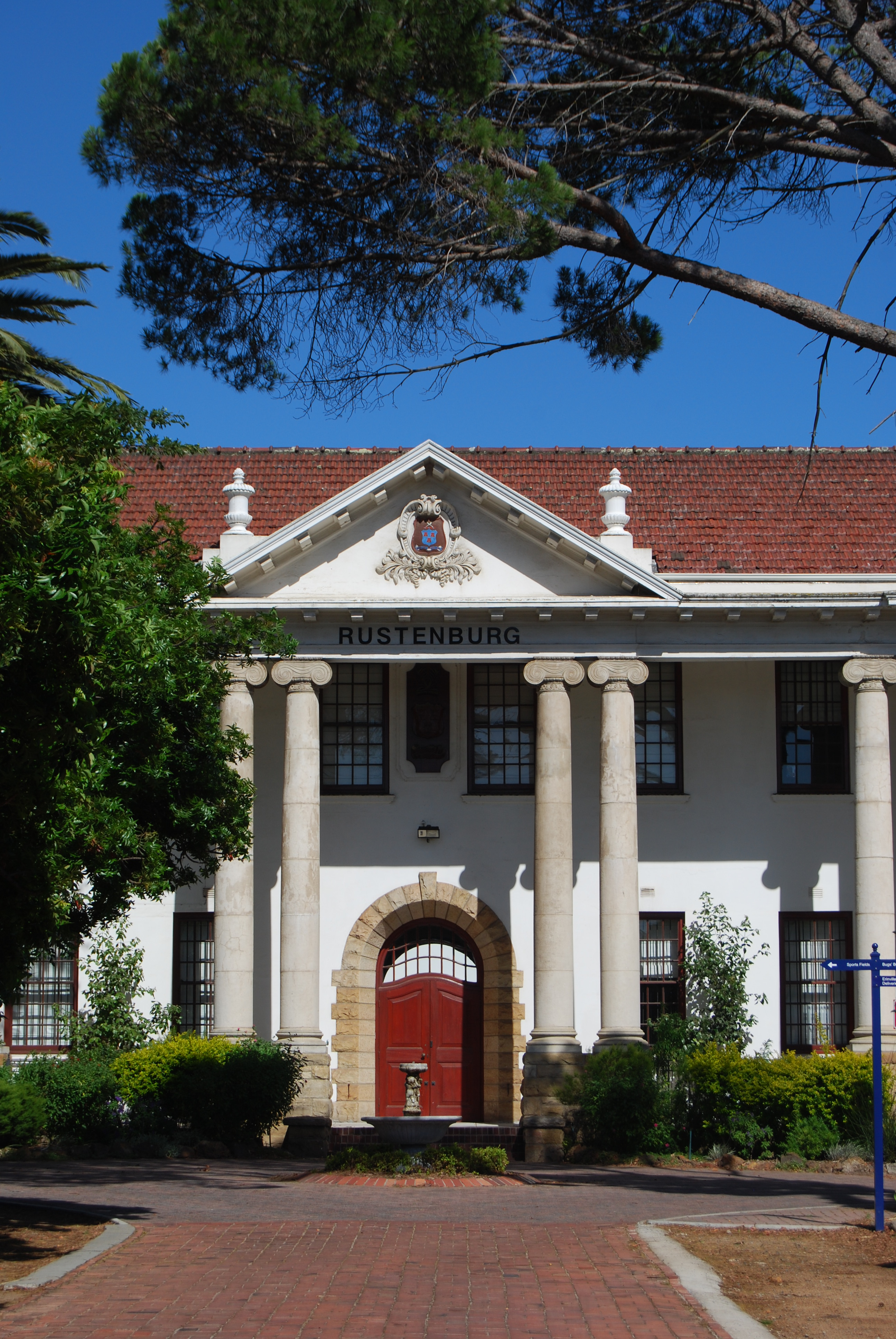
Rustenburg Girls' High School

In 2010, Rustenberg Girls' High School was placed third in a list of the top schools in the Western Cape after placing sixth in 2009.

A 2013 survey by Fairlady magazine listed Rustenburg Girls' High School among the top 25 schools in the country.

In 2014, Rustenburg Girls' High School again qualified for inclusion in the official top 20 schools list and was placed sixth.

In 2015, the Western Cape Education Department stopped ranking the top schools in order of their performance and instead listed them alphabetically. In this year, Rustenburg Girls' High School was included in the list of the top 22 schools.

In 2019, a Grade 7 student at Rustenberg Girls' Junior School came first in the Western Cape at the Horizon Maths Competition.

In 2023, a matriculant from Rustenberg Girls' High School was honoured as the country's top candidate overall as well as in Maths.

Grade 12 NSC Results	2006	2007	2008	2009	2010	2011	2012	2013	2014	2015	2016	2017	2018	2019	2020	2021	2022
Number of candidates	127	130?	142	152	161	154	136	143	151	152	149	171	143	166	163	154	165
Pass Rate (%)	100	100	100	100	100	100	100	100	100	100	100	100	100	100	98.8	100	100
Matriculation Exemption/ Bachelors Pass	98.4%	97%	99%	97%	97.5%	98%	99.3%	97.9%	98.7%	99.3%	99.3%	99.4%	99.3%	100%	97.5%	98.7%	98.2%
Subject A's	-	262	324	313	373	458	467	430	508	607	581	631	510	614	558	611	647
Top aggregate	-	106.1%	92.3%	90.8%	90.8%	94%	93%	96%	96.7%	96.2%	97.5%	96%	97.8%	96.0%	95.8%	96.5%	97.8%

== Sport ==
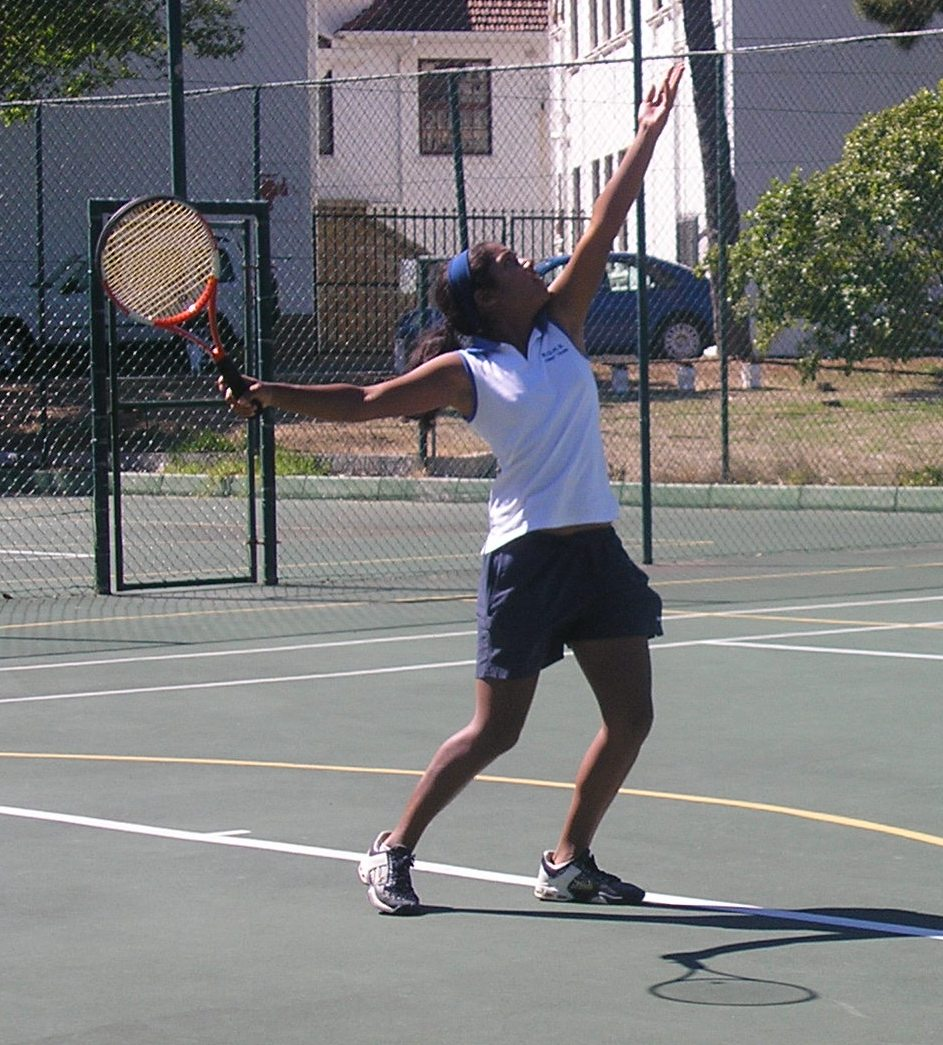
A Rustenburg tennis player at the 2006 Interschools Tennis

Rustenburg has historically been well represented in South African and Western Province teams. In 2012, two girls represented South Africa in tennis and artistic gymnastics, while two staff members represented South Africa in sevens rugby and triathlon.

The high school has nine tennis/netball courts, a swimming pool and two hockey/cricket fields. An astroturf playing field was installed during 2014 with floodlights added in 2016

The following sports are offered by Rustenburg Girls' High School: cricket, cross-country, hockey, indoor hockey, netball, running, football, squash, swimming, tennis, touch rugby, waterpolo

== Music ==
The school has an orchestra, choir, chamber choir, jazz band, wind band, string quartet, vocal quartet, string ensemble and savuyisa (marimba band).

== Notable alumni ==
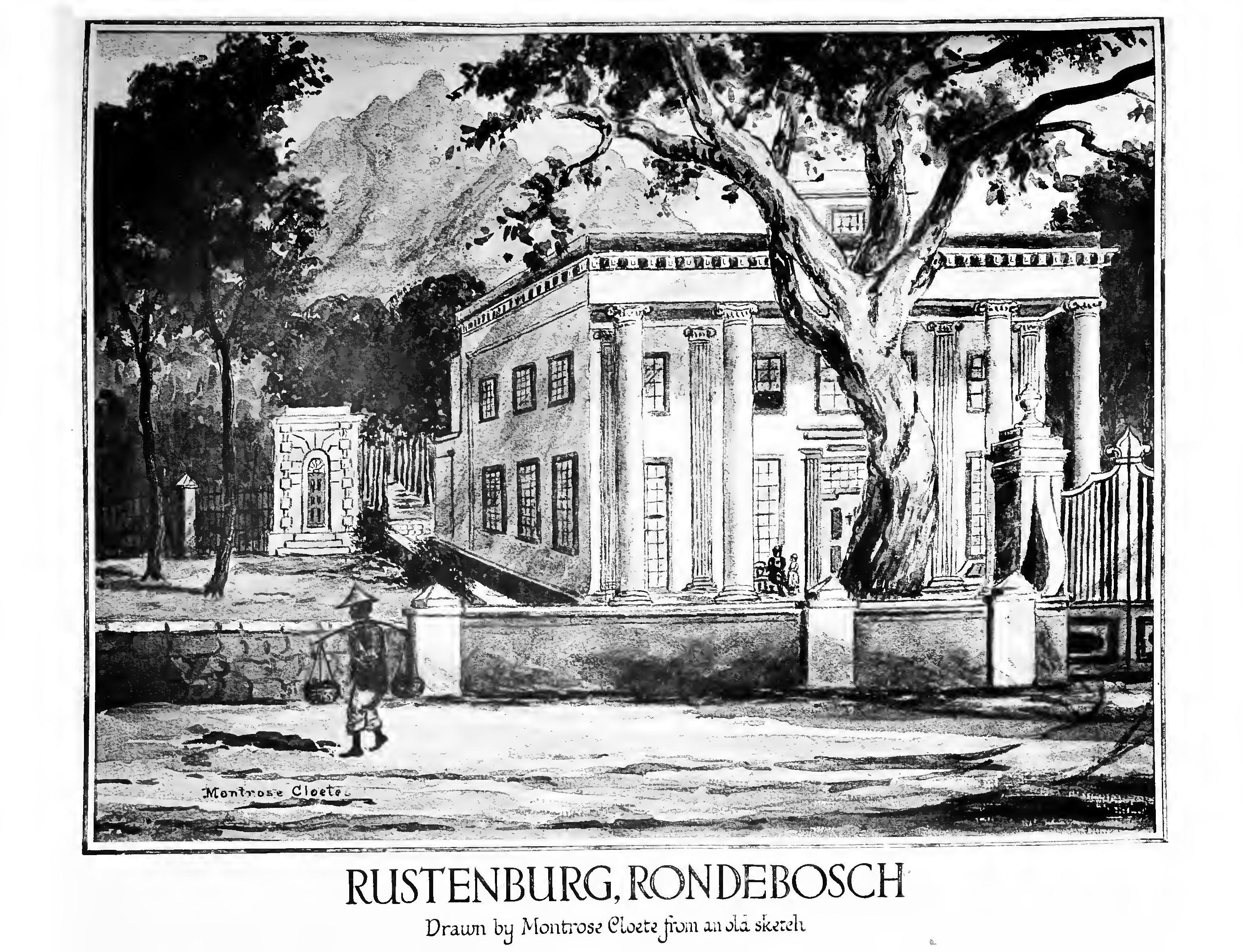
Sketch of Rustenburg House by Montrose Cloete

- Frances Ames, neurologist, psychiatrist, and human rights activist
- Jodi Balfour, film and television actress
- Louise Carver, singer
- Janette Deacon, archaeologist
- Mabel Malherbe, South African politician
- Hlubi Mboya, film and television actress and humanitarian
- Debora Patta, broadcast journalist and television producer
- Leila Reitz, the first woman elected to South Africa's parliament
- Edith Layard Stephens, botanist
- Désirée Talbot, opera singer
- Marjorie van Heerden, book illustrator
- Pauline Vogelpoel MBE, late director of the Contemporary Art Society and member of the International Council of the Tate Gallery
- Elizabeth Voigt, late director of the McGregor Museum in Kimberley

== In popular culture ==
Scenes in the films Spud 2: The Madness Continues and Spud 3: Learning to Fly were shot at the school.

== See also ==
- List of primary schools in South Africa
- List of High Schools in South Africa
