= Jill Adams (artist) =

South African artist

Jill Adams (29 October 1932 - 28 July 2016) was a South African artist. She has specialised in natural history illustrations. She was born in Durban in 1932, but lived for part of her life in Kimberley, where, on the staff of the McGregor Museum, she worked in close association with leading biologist, Dr Richard Liversidge. Adams died on 28 July 2016 in Somerset West.

== Notable work ==
=== Flowering Plants ===
Adams worked from 1974 to 1983 in the art department at the McGregor Museum in Kimberley. During this period she published her illustrated Flowering Plants of the Northern Cape (1976)

She subsequently achieved public renown for her paintings of Aloes.

=== The birds around us ===
Adams subsequently collaborated with ornithologist Richard Liversidge making their book, The birds around us: birds of the Southern African region (1990). Liversidge points out in a note "To the reader" that "this is certainly the first book on Southern African birds which has attempted to illustrate all the more common species in flight. Often a bird in flight is all that you will see." This work resulted in new observations being made with respect the Hoopoe where male and female have different flight patterns, with indications that a reclassification might need to be made for Hoopoes into "more than their present number of species."

The illustrations produced for The birds around us have been described as "the product of her outstanding draughtsmanship, coupled with a keen sense of observation and knowledge of the "natural pose" of birds." In order to keep the collection in the Northern Cape, the original paintings were purchased by the Gant family and donated to the McGregor Museum in 1991.

== Other works ==
Earlier, in 1983, Adams was commissioned by Heritage Porcelain to contribute to a series of six plates in a Collectors' edition, Best loved birds of Southern Africa to mark the centenary of the birth of Austin Roberts, South African ornithologist (1883–1948). The series includes the Cape Robin, Cossyphya caffra.
