= Malay Camp, Kimberley =

Coordinates: 28°44′45″S 24°46′01″E

The Malay Camp in Kimberley, South Africa, was a cosmopolitan suburb which was subject to forced removals prior to the Group Areas Act.

== History ==
Malay Camp had a history similar to Cape Town's District Six, Johannesburg's Sophiatown and Port Elizabeth's South End. It was a cosmopolitan suburb originating in the early days of Kimberley's existence but subject to forced slum clearance after the owner of the land (De Beers Consolidated Mines Ltd) donated the area to the Kimberley Municipality in 1939. Most of the houses, churches, mosques, shops and other buildings were demolished, making way for Kimberley's Civic Centre. This occurred from the 1940s, prior to the better known Apartheid forced removals consequent on the Group Areas Act, making Kimberley's Malay Camp clearance unique.

== Prominent residents ==
Solomon T. Plaatje, noted author, journalist and first General Secretary of the African Native National Congress, was a resident of Malay Camp. His later dwelling at 32 Angel Street is preserved as the Sol Plaatje Museum.

== Malay Camp History Projects ==
- Moosa Aysen's booklets on Islam on the Diamond Fields.
- Historical Society of Kimberley and the Northern Cape, 1998 - to collect social and living history.
- McGregor Museum Malay Camp Exhibition, 2002 (Note: Display on Malay Camp and other forgotten suburbs of Kimberley based on Historical Society research, a thesis by E.J. Africa and other sources.)
- Louis Mallett Malay Camp Social History Project, 2003
- Liz Crossley Project The Past is not Dead, 2004 (Note: Liz Crossley, a Kimberley-born artist based in Berlin who interacted with and injected ideas into or support for nearly all the above projects. Her father lived on the fringe of Malay Camp. She was instrumental in securing Rosa Luxemburg Foundation funding for the publication of Mallett's eventual book.)
- Permanent display at the McGregor Museum, 2006, (Note: Display opened by Premier Dipuo Peters - funding provided by the Northern Cape Department of Tourism, owing to the efforts of Louis Mallett)
