= Désirée Talbot =

South African musical artist (1926–2020)

- Born: 24 October 1926
- Died: 24 July 2020 (aged 93)
- Genres: Opera

Professor Désirée Talbot (born 24 October 1926, Cape Town, South Africa – 24 July 2020) was a South African opera soprano and one of the founding members of the UCT Opera Company.

== Early life and education ==
She was educated at Collegiate Girls' High School in Port Elizabeth and afterwards at Rustenburg Girls High in Cape Town. Her father was a civil engineer and an amateur organist and pianist. Her mother was also musical and took piano lessons with Doris Lardner at the South African College of Music in Cape Town.

As a student registered for BMus at UCT she took piano as first subject. When her left hand was permanently damaged in a car accident that occurred while returning from a rugby match with her boyfriend, she switched to singing as her main subject. She studied with Ernest Dennis and Adelheid Armhold, obtaining Teachers and Performers Licentiate Diplomas from Unisa and UCT. She started out as a music teacher at various primary schools, but in 1949 she was appointed to teach at Rustenburg Girls High where she stayed until 1954. She taught piano, theory and aural training and worked for the SABC for a year as music programme compiler. It was during this period that she was married to Alfred Garson, also a musician. In 1954, she joined the staff of the UCT Faculty of Music as a teacher of singing and piano. She covered choral conducting and acted as an accompanist.

== Singing career ==
In 1947, she had joined the UCT Opera Company which had been founded and was being directed by Erik Chisholm. It was in these early years that Talbot had the opportunity to sing in a production of Orpheus at the Little Theatre with Albert Coates conducting the orchestra. She also attended lectures on singing given by the Russian opera singer Oda Slobodskay.

During her career as a singer, which extended more than thirty years, she sang leading roles in over 500 performances of 28 operas as well as concerts and broadcasts in South Africa, Namibia, Zambia, England, Scotland and Italy. She gave concerts in London at the Wigmore Hall and performed the song cycle Van liefde en verlatenheid by Arnold van Wyk at the SABC. She joined the UCT Opera Company on their tour to Great Britain and Scotland for The Festival of Music and Musicians from South Africa in 1956. Erik Chisholm accompanied her on her tour of the British Universities and other towns in Great Britain. She was acclaimed as an excellent singer and actress and the well-known J Arthur Rank Film Productions even offered her an audition for a role in a film which she could not accept at the time. In England she sang in the first British stage performance of Bartók's Bluebeard's Castle as well as the role of Magda in Menotti's The Consul in London and Glasgow.

In 1958 when she returned to Cape Town she was appointed assistant repetiteur to the UCT Opera School. During this period she was also appointed official singing teacher to the Eoan Group. In addition to her teaching obligations she produced The Marriage of Figaro for the UCT Opera Company. In 1960 she received a bursary for advanced study in Italy from the Italian government. 'In recognition of services to opera in South Africa.' Here she studied with Gina Cigna in Milan. She sang in a performance of La Bohème in Milan and did excerpts from Tosca in a concert of international singers. She was interviewed and sang on RAI as well. She was invited to audition at La Scala. In Rome Menotti offered her the soprano part in Verdi's Requiem at the next Spoleto festival, but reluctantly withdrew the offer when he discovered she was a South African. When her money ran out in Italy she worked as private secretary to the honorary SA Consul in Milan.

== Academic career ==
Stellenbosch University offered her a position at the Conservatorium of Music as lecturer in Singing and she returned to South Africa to launch her new career as academic. In 1967 she was appointed senior lecturer in singing at UCT and in 1979 was promoted to associate professor. She lectured in voice training, performing literature and repertoire for teaching purposes in singing, and in vocal teaching method. In 1984/5 she was appointed deputy dean of the Faculty of Music at UCT. She also acted as chairman of the Music Library Committee during the period from 1984 to 1986.

In July/August 1984 she accepted an invitation to conduct master classes and lectures at Melbourne University and the National Conservatoire of Music and Opera in Sydney, Australia. She also was interviewed on ABC and recorded a series of four talks on Singing and Singers for them.

Back in South Africa she was appointed deputy acting director of the Faculty of Music, UCT. She was chosen as Woman of Distinction for the Faculty of Music for the Centenary of Women on Campus celebrations by UCT. 1n 1990 she was invited to serve on an HSRC Committee to plan a new format for teaching singing in universities and technikons in South Africa. She also was approached to serve as examiner at the countrywide musical examinations for Unisa. In 1991 the SABC asked her to assist in redesigning their National Vocal Competition repertoire lists.

At her retirement from the Faculty of Music, UCT, she was made emeritus associate professor. She continued on as a part-time vocal teacher at UCT until the end of 1994. She retired from singing in 1978, returning once to the stage of the Nico Malan theatre in 1982 to sing Mamita in Gigi.
