= Rudolph Carl Bigalke =

Rudolph Carl Bigalke was a zoologist, a director of the McGregor Museum in Kimberley, South Africa, subsequently heading the Department of nature conservation at the University of Stellenbosch and serving for several terms as Dean of the Faculty of Forestry at that university. He was born in Kimberley on 24 February 1932 and died on 28 November 2002 at his home in Stellenbosch. He was affectionately known as 'Rudi' and also had the nickname 'Loxodonta africana'.

== Early life and education ==
Growing up on a farm outside Kimberley, his interest in zoology originated early in life. Schooled at Kimberley Boys' High School, he went on to Rhodes University in Grahamstown where he graduated with a BSc Honours in zoology and a university education diploma.

Bigalke continued his studies under Gustav Kramer at J.W. Goethe University at Frankfurt am Main, where he was awarded a PhD in 1956.

== McGregor Museum ==
Following an initial appointment at the Etosha National Park in what was then South West Africa (now Namibia), Bigalke joined the staff of the McGregor Museum in his home town of Kimberley in 1958.

== Natal Parks and Stellenbosch University ==
Bigalke left Kimberley in 1964 to take up the position as Principal Research Officer for the Natal Parks Board in Pietermaritzburg.

In 1970 Bigalke was appointed to head the Department of Nature Conservation at the University of Stellenbosch, serving also as Dean of the Faculty of Forestry for several terms.

== Personal life ==
In 1957 Bigalke married Ingebord Gaber whom he had met in Windhoek the previous year and they had two sons, Michael and Martin.
