= McGregor Museum =

Multidisciplinary museum in Kimberley, South Africa

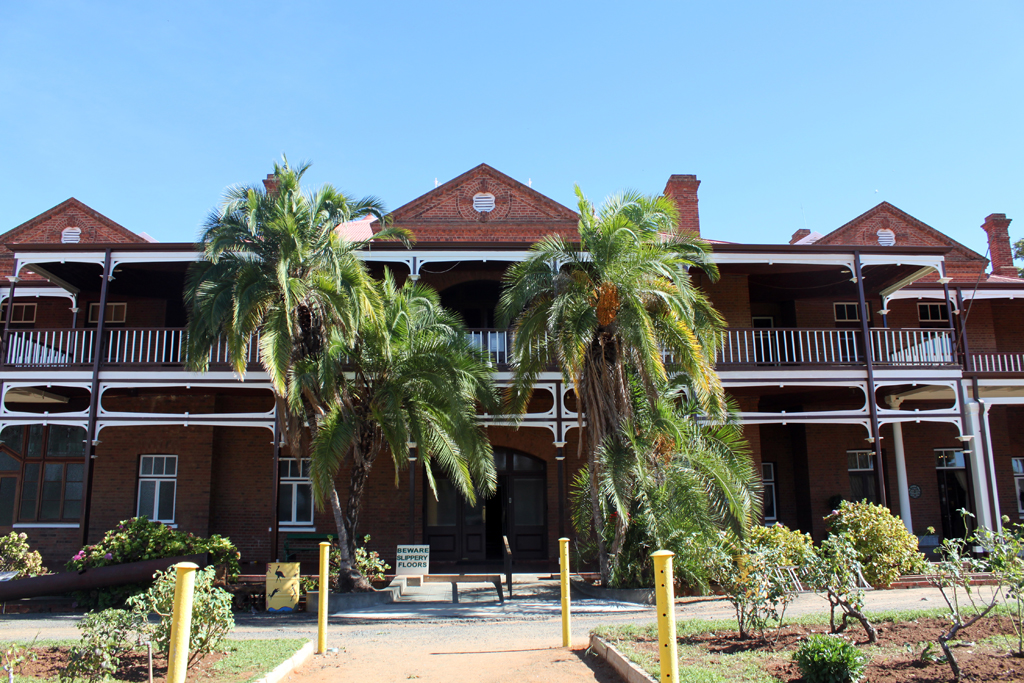
- Main building, Atlas Street, Kimberley
- Established: 1907
- Location: 7 Atlas Street, Herlear, Kimberley, Northern Cape, South Africa
- Coordinates: 28°44′59″S 24°46′48″E
- Type: Multidisciplinary museum
- Owner: Board of Trustees / Provincial Public Entity
- Parking: In museum grounds, Atlas Street, Kimberley
- Website: McGregor Museum & FACEBOOK page

The McGregor Museum in Kimberley, South Africa, originally known as the Alexander McGregor Memorial Museum, is a multidisciplinary museum which serves Kimberley and the Northern Cape, established in 1907.

== Overview ==
Housed at first in a purpose-built museum building in Chapel Street, Kimberley, and spreading to occupy further spaces in the city, the museum was, and still is, governed by a Board of Trustees, aided financially by the Kimberley municipality (up to the 1950s), then by the Cape Provincial Administration and, today, by the Northern Cape Administration through the Department of Sport, Arts and Culture. In May 2014 it was declared a Provincial Public Entity, effective from 1 April 2014.

Alexander McGregor had been a Mayor of Kimberley, whose wife bequeathed the building to perpetuate his memory.

Today the museum has its headquarters at the old Kimberley Sanatorium building in Belgravia, Kimberley, and it has several satellites including the original building in Chapel Street. The museum was founded on 24 September 1907. By coincidence 24 September was chosen as Heritage Day, a public holiday in South Africa post-1994.

The McGregor Museum is a primary research institute in and for the Northern Cape (and is anticipated to have a role in articulation with the School of Heritage which is to be a part of the Sol Plaatje University) in fields of natural and cultural history (including zoology, botany, general history, South African struggle history, archaeology, social anthropology). It curates important collections and archival material (see below) and, on the basis of its collections and research activities, performs educational and outreach functions to the community locally and throughout the province. Research programs include international collaborative projects.

== Museum directors ==
The McGregor Museum operates as a Provincial Public Entity (as of April 2014), governed by a board of trustees. It was originally aided by the Kimberley Municipality, De Beers and many donors (from 1907); then by the Cape Provincial Administration (from 1958); and, from 1994, as a Province-aided Museum receiving an annual grant from the Department of Sport, Arts and Culture, Northern Cape Province, which also employed the staff of the museum.

Directors of the McGregor Museum have been:

- Maria Wilman (1908–1946)
- John Hyacinth Power (1947–1958)
- Rudolph Carl Bigalke (1958–1964)
- Richard Liversidge (1966–1986)
- Elizabeth Anne Voigt (1987–1999)
- Colin Fortune (2000–2014)
- Sunet Swanepoel (2014–2017 Acting), (2017– )

== Collections and exhibits ==
The museum houses major natural history and cultural history collections including a botanical herbarium, zoology collections, a history archive (including documents, photographs and oral history recordings), ethnography collections, archaeology and rock art collections, physical anthropology, palaeontology and geology collections. Most of these fields are represented by professional staff and collection managers, and the collections and associated research programs are reflected in permanent and temporary exhibits in various sections and buildings of the museum as well as in outreach programs in the province and displays in smaller museums.

== Expansion to the sanatorium ==
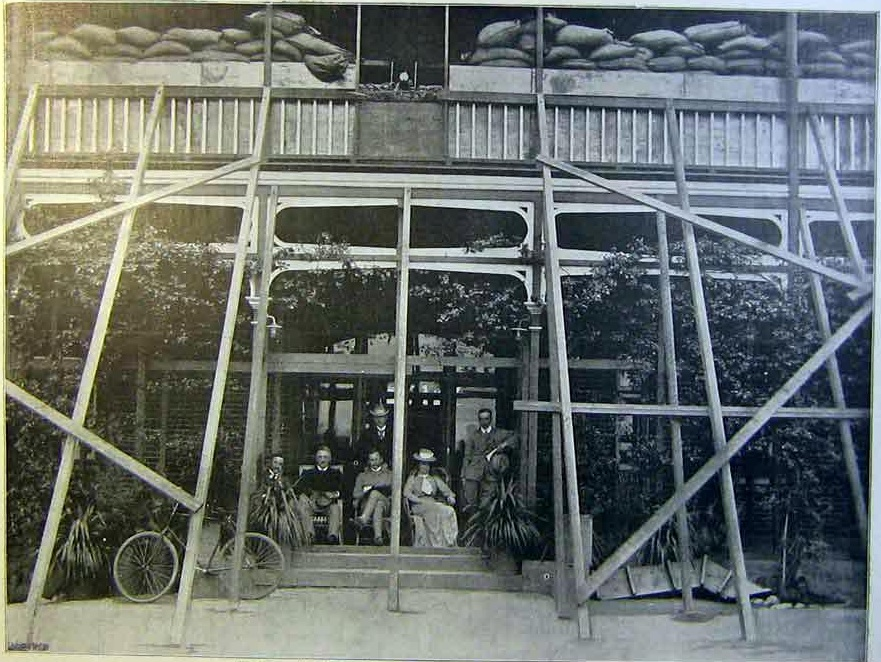
Cecil Rhodes posing at the Sanatorium during the Siege of Kimberley

Outgrowing available space at its buildings in town, the museum's headquarters were moved in 1973 to the former Kimberley Sanatorium (built in 1897), which at one time served also as the Hotel Belgrave (1908–1933) and as the Holy Family Convent School, Kimberley (1933–1971). The new museum headquarters were officially opened on 22 November 1976. For the duration of the Siege of Kimberley (14 October 1899 – 15 February 1900) during the Anglo-Boer War, Cecil John Rhodes lodged in rooms at what was then the Sanatorium.

== Satellites ==
Branches of the McGregor Museum today include the original McGregor Memorial Museum in town (city history displays), the Duggan-Cronin Gallery (photographic and ethnographic museum), two house museums, Dunluce and Rudd House, the Pioneers of Aviation Museum, the Magersfontein Battlefield Museum, Wonderwerk Cave near Kuruman and the Wildebeest Kuil Rock Art Centre outside Kimberley.

== Some major museum projects and programmes ==
- Founding of the South African Museums Association in Kimberley in 1936
- Building of Chapwood Building with funds from McGregor Family, 1950s
- The Griqualand West Story, 1959
- Rudd House donated to the museum, 1969
- Magersfontein Battlefield Museum development, 1971 (refurbished in 1999 for the Anglo-Boer War centenary)
- Move to the Sanatorium and building of new displays, 1973–1976
- Dunluce donated to the museum, 1975
- Memorial to the Pioneers of Aviation Museum, 1981
- Nooitgedacht open air displays, 1985
- Restoration and opening of Rudd House, 1988 (restored again in 2008)
- Opening of the new Humanities Block, 1991
- Wonderwerk Cave Site Museum opening, 1993
- Displays on the coming of democracy opened by Premier Manne Dipico, 1995
- Through Vuzi's Lens – photographic display
- Sol Plaatje Museum displays at 32 Angel Street
- Frontiers Gallery opened by Khuza Bogacwi, 1998
- Ancestors Gallery opened by MEC Brian Hermanus, 1999
- Victoria West Museum displays opened
- Magersfontein Battlefield Museum refurbished for the centenary, 1999
- Siege of Kimberley Concert and Ball, 1999, 2000
- Canteen Kopje and Barkly West Museum, 2000
- Wildebeest Kuil Rock Art Centre public archaeology development, 2001, opened by Premier Manne Dipico and Cheryl Carolus
- Robben Island project exhibition, opened by Ahmed Kathrada, 2001
- Workshop on human remains and publication of Skeletons in the Cupboard, 2001
- Malay Camp and Greenpoint history projects, 2002
- Finalist in first Provincial Premier's Award, 2003
- Ten Years of Democracy displays, 2004, and a contribution to the "Democracy X" exhibition at Iziko South African Museumin Cape Town, in the same year.
- Duggan-Cronin photographic exhibition at Museum Africa in Johannesburg
- Malay Camp displays opened by Premier Dipuo Peters, 2006
- Duggan-Cronin Gallery restoration and new displays, 2007
- Thandabantu exhibition, Alfred Martin Duggan-Cronin and Richard Madela – a photographic journey through Southern Africa 1919–1939, at Iziko South African Museum, Cape Town, 2007
- McGregor Museum Centenary, 1907–2007 – restoration of the original museum building with new displays
- Wildebeest Kuil Rock Art Centre declared a Provincial Heritage Site, 19 September 2008.
- Rudd House restored and re-opened, 23 September 2008.
- Contributed Stow's copies of rock engravings to the "George William Stow Exhibition" at Iziko South African Museum, Cape Town, November 2008.
- Wonderwerk Cave approved as a Grade 1 National Heritage Site, Mar 2009. An international symposium on the site was held at Wonderwerk Cave in June 2009.
- A role in the government project entitled 'The History of the Liberation Struggle in the Northern Cape' (2009). "This project will encapsulate our role as a province in the liberation struggle, and will serve as a gift from our veterans to the youth of the province", said Premier Hazel Jenkins in her State of the Province Address, 12 June 2009. The project was launched at the McGregor Museum on Heritage Day 24 September 2009.
- The "Sacred Legacy" exhibition combining the "Shared Legacies", namely the photographic works of Edward Curtis and Alfred Martin Duggan-Cronin, opened at the Centre for African Studies, University of Cape Town, 14 October 2009.
- One of the host museums for the 77th South African Museums Association (SAMA) national conference, October 2013. SAMA having been established in Kimberley in 1936, the museum had helped host the Golden and Diamond Jubilee conferences in 1986 and 1996 respectively.
