= Alfred Martin Duggan-Cronin =

Alfred Martin Duggan-Cronin was an Irish-born South African photographer who undertook several photographic and collecting expeditions in South Africa and adjacent territories between 1919 and 1939, in the course of which he documented people and rural life throughout the subcontinent. Based in Kimberley, it was while working in the mine compounds that he initially encountered African migrant workers, stimulating an interest in ethnographic subjects. Duggan-Cronin was born on 17 May 1874 in Innishannon, County Cork, Ireland, and died on 25 August 1954 in Kimberley, South Africa..

== Background and career ==
Born in Ireland, Duggan-Cronin was educated at Mount St Mary's College in Derbyshire, England. Giving up an original goal of becoming a Jesuit priest, he went to South Africa in 1897, taking a job with De Beers Consolidated Mines in Kimberley, where he served as a security officer in one of the mine 'native compounds'. His daily interaction with the men who worked in the mines was undoubtedly influential when he later developed an interest in photographic portraiture and documentation. He worked for De Beers until his retirement in 1932.

In 1904 Duggan-Cronin bought himself a simple box camera, while on a return visit to Britain, and his first photograph was of a swan house on Madeira. He honed his photographic skill taking still-life pictures of flowers, and animal studies including images of poultry and horses. He documented holidays to the Cape, Johannesburg and Bulawayo in the period 1906 to 1914, also compiling albums from trips in Europe. Important series include portraits of Kimberley personalities and, later, of visitors to the Duggan-Cronin Gallery. Geological photographs by Duggan-Cronin were commissioned for De Beers, while a significant contribution was his documentation of rock engravings, published as plates in Maria Wilman's 1933 book on the rock art of Griqualand West. During World War I, Duggan-Cronin took part in campaigns in German South West Africa and in East Africa, generating a photographic record of these events.

Duggan-Cronin embarked on the first of his major ethnographic endeavours in 1919 when he went to the Langeberg to photograph the San people living there – the first of many expeditions into Kimberley's Southern African hinterland. Between the world wars he travelled some 128 000 kilometres, making at least 18 expeditions to photograph the peoples of southern Africa. He was accompanied by his Mfengu assistant, Richard Madela, on some of these expeditions.

A significant number of his photographs were published in The Bantu Tribes of South Africa: Reproductions of Photographic Studies by A.M. Duggan-Cronin, eleven volumes of which appeared under the imprint of the McGregor Memorial Museum, Kimberley, between 1928 and 1954. In 1925 he opened his first 'Bantu Gallery' at his home on Kimberley's outskirts, his collection of some 8,000 photographs and ethnographic objects being more permanently housed at what was named the Duggan-Cronin Bantu Gallery at The Lodge in Kimberley from the late 1930s.

At his Gallery, Duggan-Cronin hosted many eminent visitors including Olive Schreiner, the Free State President Reitz, Alfred Lord Milner, General Jan Smuts, Abbé Breuil, Noël Coward and the British royal family.

== Gallery ==
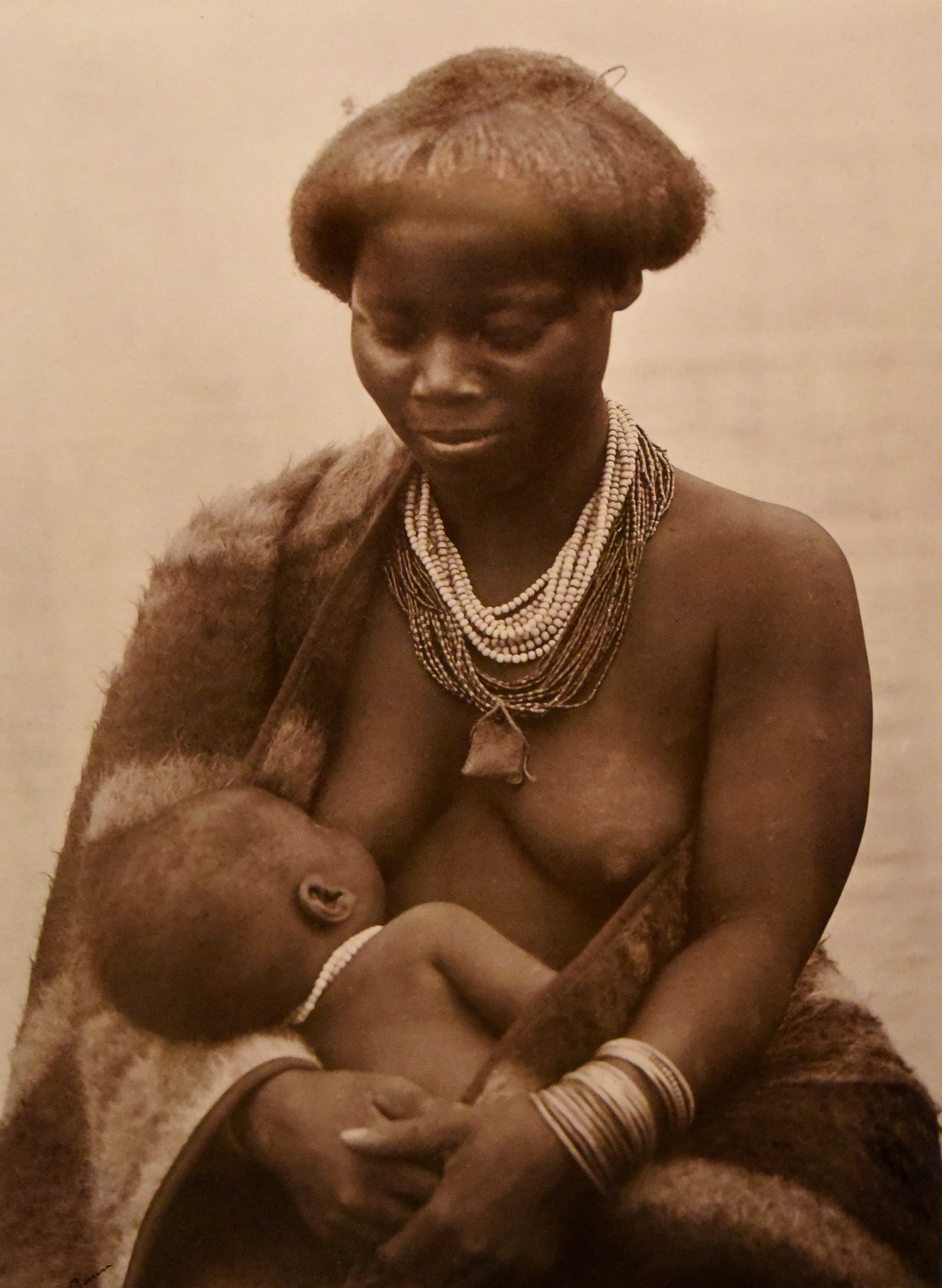
A Pedi woman breastfeeding. Alfred Duggan-Cronin. South Africa, early 20th century. The Wellcome Collection, London

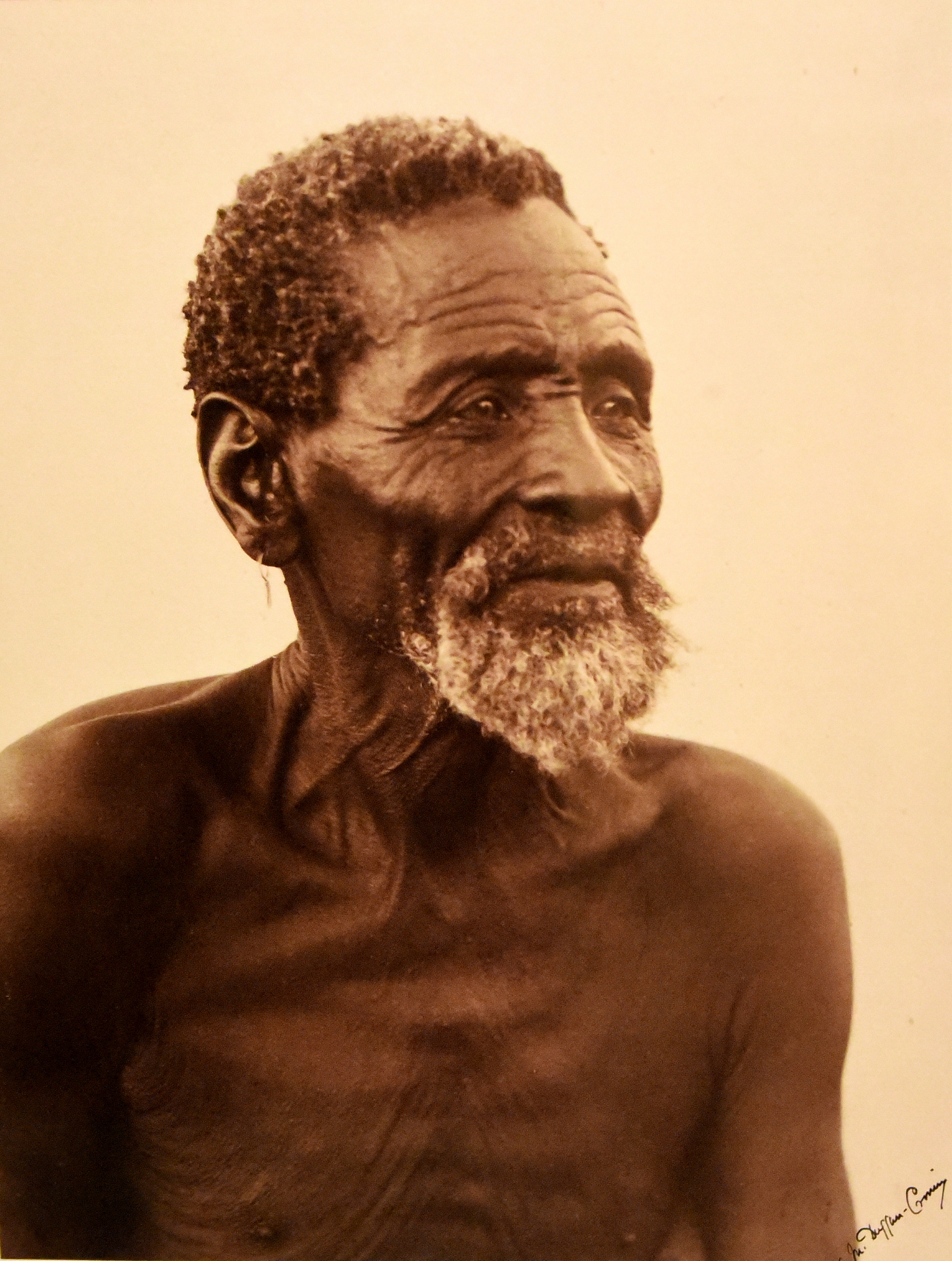
Portrait of a bushman. Alfred Duggan-Cronin. South Africa, early 20th century. The Wellcome Collection, London

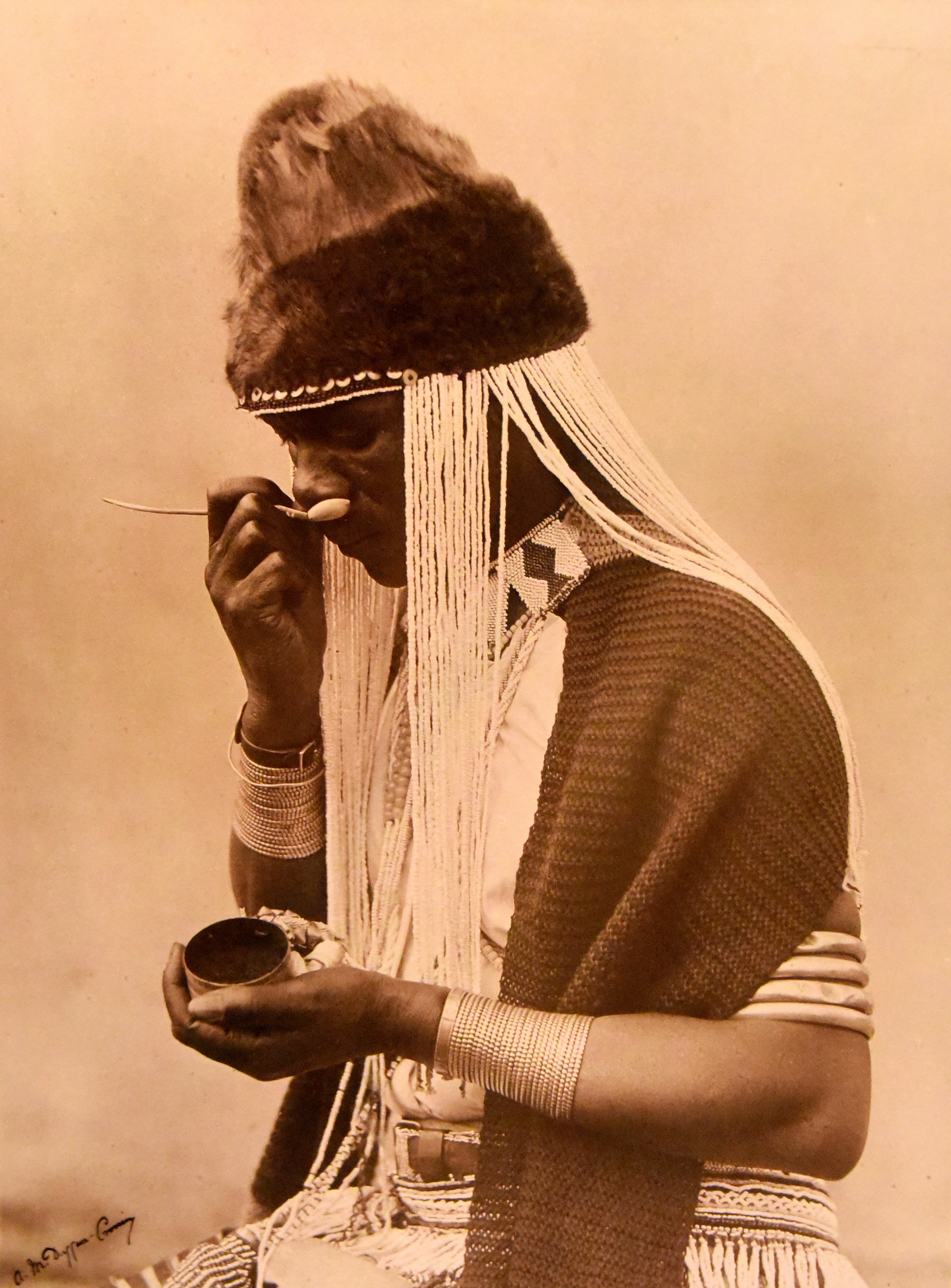
A witch doctor taking snuff. Alfred Duggan-Cronin. South Africa, early 20th century. The Wellcome Collection, London

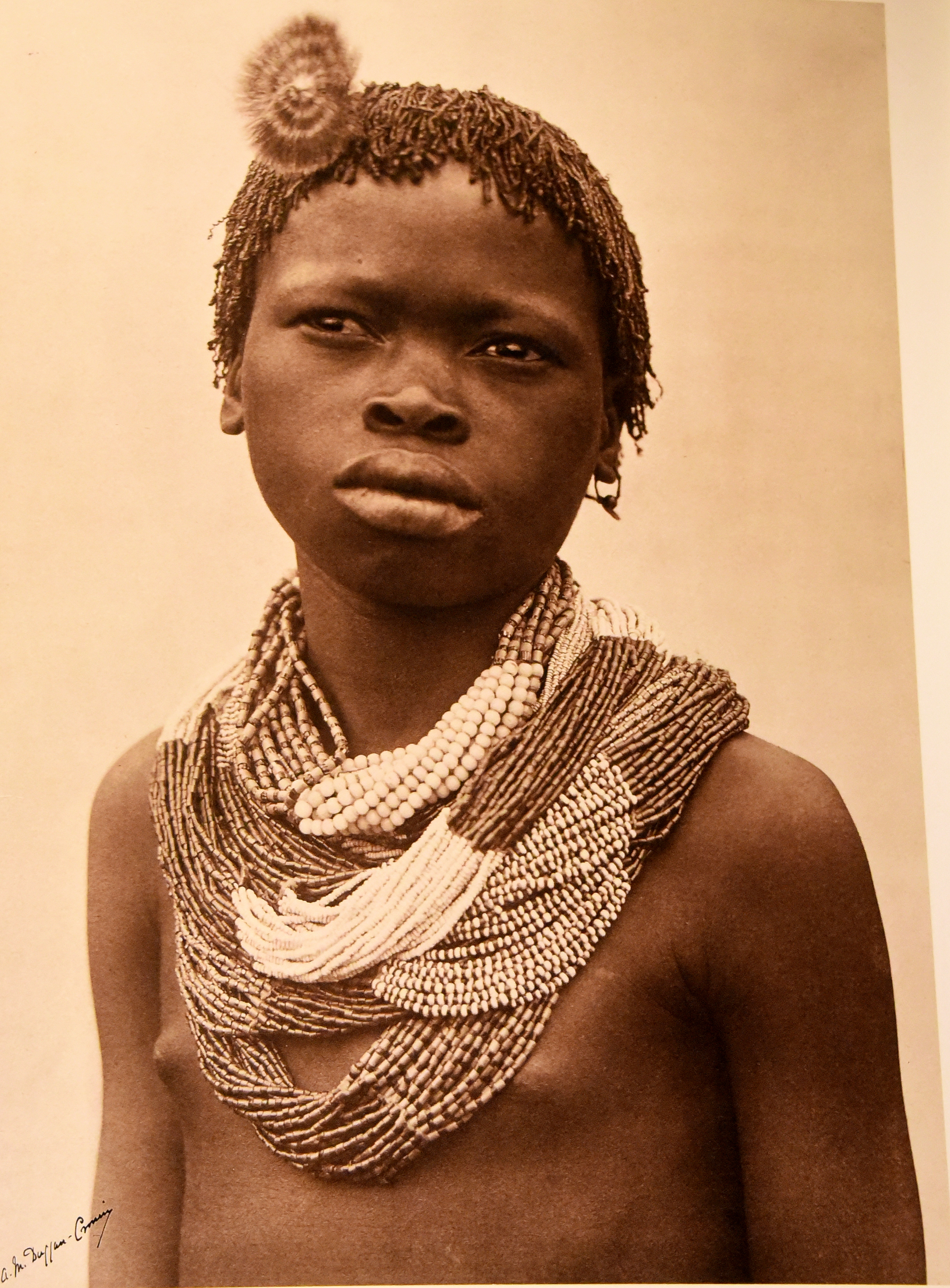
A girl. Alfred Duggan-Cronin. South Africa, early 20th century. The Wellcome Collection, London
