= Duggan-Cronin Gallery =

Coordinates: 28°44′52″S 24°46′54″E

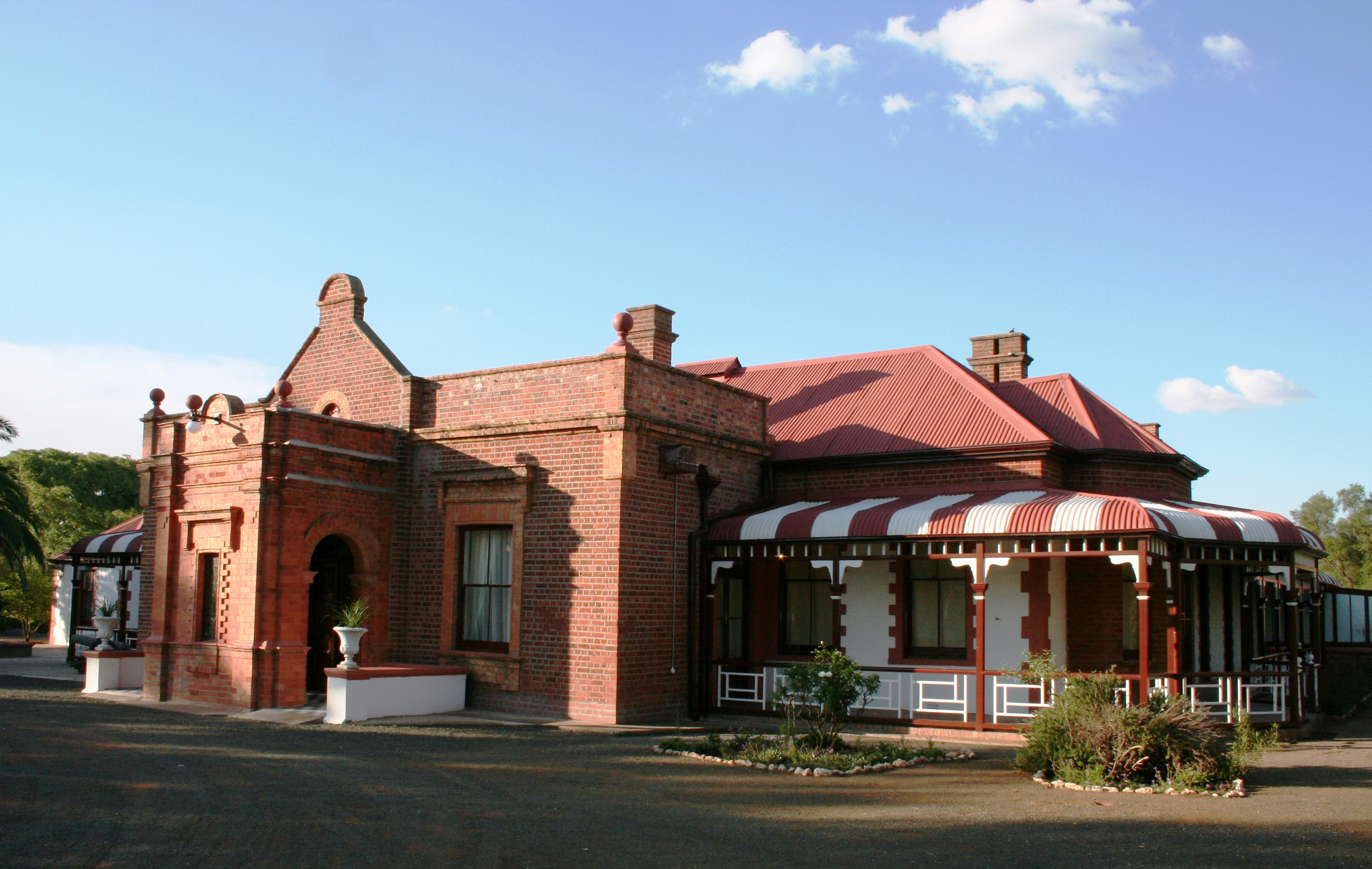
The Duggan-Cronin Gallery

The Duggan-Cronin Gallery, which is a satellite of the McGregor Museum in Kimberley, South Africa, houses in part the legacy in photographs and ethnographic artefacts of the photographer Alfred Martin Duggan-Cronin. It occupies a former dwelling known as The Lodge. Built in 1889, to a design by the architect Sydney Stent, The Lodge was the residence of John Blades Currey, manager of the London & S.A. Exploration Co. De Beers Consolidated Mines Ltd acquired the extensive property of the London & S.A. Exploration Co in 1899, including The Lodge, which continued to be used as a residence.

== Duggan-Cronin ==
In the late 1930s De Beers made The Lodge available to A.M. Duggan-Cronin to establish what he called (progressively, at the time) the 'Bantu Gallery'. Exhibits were arranged by tribe in the various rooms of the house. These were re-arranged in the 1980s to incorporate a more strongly historical narrative, while more concerted work on the Duggan-Cronin collections resulted in a much more substantial display reconfiguration in the early 2000s.
