= South African Museums Association =

The South African Museums Association (SAMA), a professional body for museums and museum personnel, was founded at a meeting of museum representatives held in the ‘Chinese Room’, Kimberley Public Library, in Kimberley, South Africa, on 23 April 1936. Convened by Mr C.J. Swierstra, an entomologist who was director of the Transvaal Museum, it was established to improve and extend a museum service in South Africa; to encourage interaction between kindred institutions and interested persons; and to generate and communicate museological knowledge in the South African context. Twenty two individuals representing 19 institutions were present at the inaugural meeting of the association.

== Conferences and publications ==
The association has fulfilled its goals in part through convening regular annual conferences and workshops, held throughout South Africa, with conference papers being made available through its Bulletin, SAMAB, and via less formal communications in national and branch newsletters.

== Provincial branches ==
As the association grew, so provincial and local branches were formed, in the Western Cape (1975), Transvaal (1982), Eastern Cape (1982), Kwa-Zulu Natal (1984) and SAMA Central, serving the Free State and Northern Cape (1991). After 1994 further branches were formed in Gauteng, Mpumalanga, Limpopo and North West Province.

== Regional role ==
SAMA’s geographical scope was sub-continental, not restricted solely to South Africa, with membership open to museum personnel beyond South Africa’s borders. To emphasize this, SAMA officially changed its name to Southern African Museums Association (1975 to 1995), continuing to make its services accessible to members north of the Limpopo.

The association clashed with the state in the 1980s over the apartheid government’s “general affairs”/”own affairs” policies, which impacted on the administration of museums. SAMA’s stance was strongly affirmed in its 1987 Pietermaritzburg Declaration for South African museums. Concurrently the association embarked on its own process of democratization, amending its constitution in 1990 to strengthen branch representation on council and spelling out its aims to encourage museological research, to promote use of museums, and enhancement of professional training.
