= Sol Plaatje Museum =

Coordinates: 28.746017°S 24.763457°E

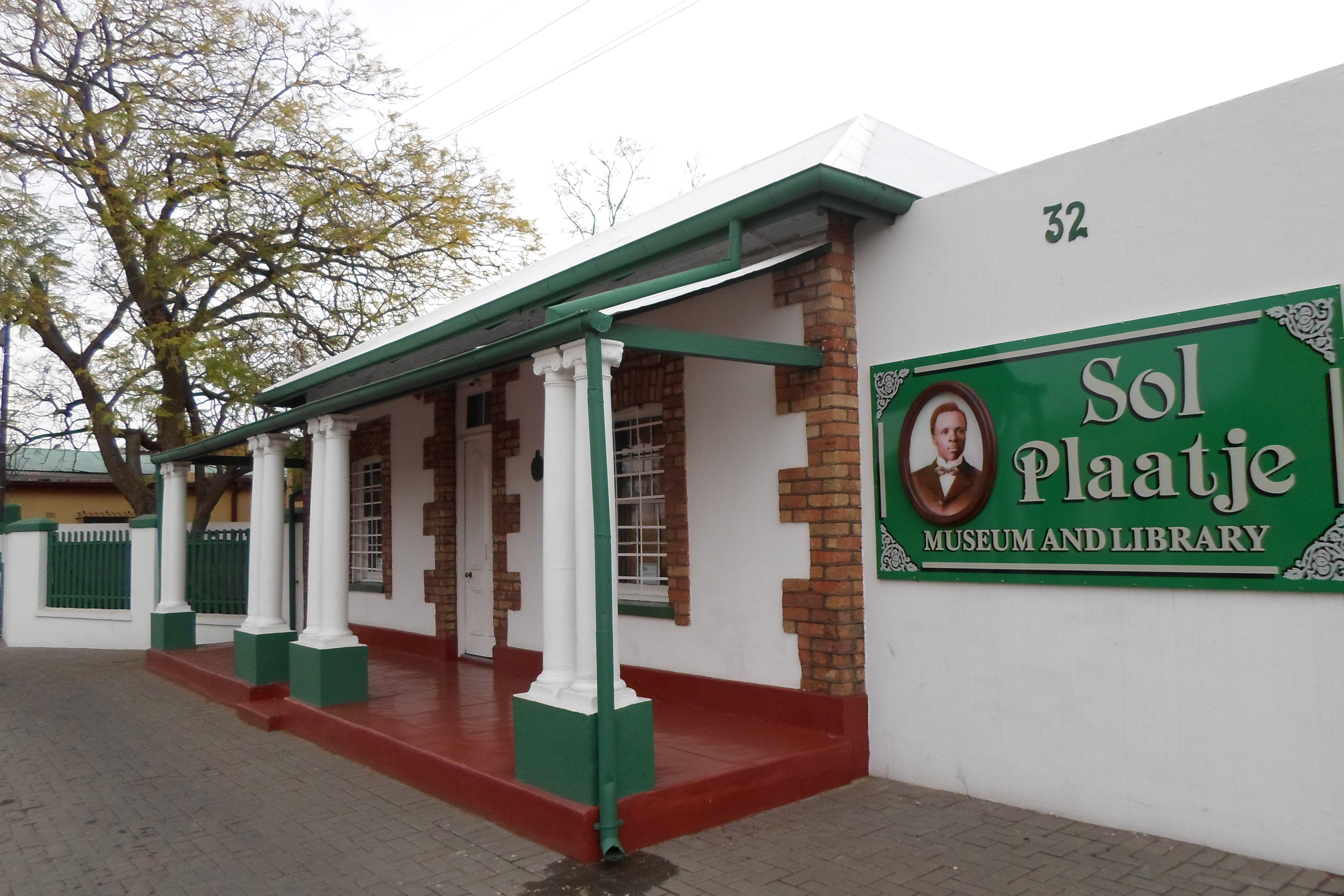
Entrance at Sol Plaatje Museum

The Sol Plaatje Museum and Library is in Kimberley, Northern Cape, South Africa, in a house where Solomon T. Plaatje lived during his last years at 32 Angel Street, Malay Camp. It was here that Plaatje wrote Mhudi.

The Sol Plaatje Educational Trust was set up in 1991 to serve as a custodian for this and other legacy projects. In 1992, 32 Angel Street was declared a National Monument (Provincial Heritage Site under 1999 legislation. Plaatje's grave in West End Cemetery, Kimberley, is also a declared provincial heritage site.
