= People of Kimberley =

Notable people from Kimberley, Northern Cape

This is a list of the famous and notable people from or associated with Kimberley, Northern Cape, South Africa.

== List of famous people from Kimberley, Northern Cape ==
Table of contents:

A B C D E F G H I J K L M N O P Q R S T U V W X Y Z

=== A ===
- Benny Alexander, who adopted the name Khoisan X, General Secretary of the Pan Africanist Congress
- Diane Awerbuck, South African novelist.

=== B ===
- Frances Baard, trade-unionist who grew up in Kimberley - and after whom the District Municipality is named.
- Xenophon Constantine Balaskas, Springbok cricketer, 1930-1939.
- Barney Barnato
- Alfred Beit
- Benjamin Bennett, author.
- Dr Rudolph Bigalke, director of the National Zoological Gardens of South Africa (Pretoria), 1927 to 1962.
- Rudolph Carl Bigalke, zoologist and one-time director of the McGregor Museum.
- Charl Bouwer, paralympic swimmer and 2012 gold medallist, born in Kimberley

=== C ===
- Clive Mopeleti, Filmmaker and Philanthropist.

=== D ===
- Clive Derby-Lewis, politician, imprisoned for his role in the assassination of Chris Hani. Born in Cape Town but grew up in Kimberley.
- Manne Dipico
- Frank Dobbin, rugby player

=== G ===
- Kgosi Galeshewe, BaTlhaping leader and anti-colonial resistance leader.
- Henry Richard Giddy, member of the Red Cap Party that led the rush on Colesberg Kopje or 'New Rush', later Kimberley

=== H ===
- Dorian Haarhoff
- Reeza Hendricks, Professional cricketer for the Highveld Lions and The Proteas.
- Richard Henyekane, South African football striker.
- William Benbow Humphreys (1889-1965), politician, founder of and principal benefactor behind Kimberley's William Humphreys Art Gallery, and recipient of the Freedom of the City of Kimberley.

=== J ===
- Dan Jacobson, author, grew up in Kimberley
- Leander Starr Jameson

=== K ===
- Bronwyn Katz, sculptor and visual artist, and a founding member of iQhiya Collective
- Victor Khojane, otherwise known as Dr Victor, reggae and R&B musician
- Aggrey Klaaste, Editor of The Sowetan, grew up in Kimberley.
- Bernard Klisser, after whom the Kimberley suburb Klisserville is named.
- Jbe' Kruger, golfer.

=== L ===
- George Labram, De Beers Engineer who designed and built Long Cecil.
- Richard Liversidge, ornithologist and museum director.

=== M ===
- Gail Nkoane Mabalane, actress, model and singer
- Phakamile Mabija, anti-apartheid activist who died in police custody in Kimberley in 1977
- Thebe Magugu, fashion designer.
- Adolph Malan, better known as Sailor Malan, famed World War II RAF fighter pilot and later leading member of the anti-Apartheid Torch Commando and Springbok Legion in South Africa.
- Brian Marajh, Bishop of George.
- Manie Maritz, Boer general.
- Z.K. Matthews, President of the African National Congress, spent his youth in Kimberley.
- Sarah Gertrude Millin, author, spent her formative years, 1888–1912, in Kimberley and the nearby Waldeck's Plant.
- Harold Arthur Morris, Freeman of Kimberley.
- Karen Muir, Olympic medalist (swimming).

Sello Hendrick Matsie, Veteran Former Freedom fighter of the ANC, former SABC Journalist and former Spokesperson for the Sol Plaatje Municipality for more than two decades.

=== N ===
- Gideon "Mgibe" Nxumalo - Jazz pianist, arranger, composer.

Justice Sibongile Albert Punch Nxumalo. Former Freedom fighter and Advocate of the High Court of South Africa and Nigeria.

=== O ===
- Ernest Oppenheimer
- Harry Oppenheimer

=== P ===
- Sol Plaatje, journalist, publisher, and political activist. His former home is now a museum and library.
- Dipuo Peters, second Premier of the Northern Cape Province.
- Frank Templeton Prince, poet.

=== R ===
- Cecil Rhodes
- J.B. Robinson
- Dr Donald Ross, cardiac surgeon
- Bevil Rudd, Olympic medalist (athletics).
- Charles Rudd

=== S ===
- A.H.M. Scholtz, author.
- Olive Schreiner, author, who lived in Kimberley 1894-1897.
- Gert Smal, former rugby union player and coach.
- Robert Sobukwe, founder of the Pan Africanist Congress.
- Richard Southey (colonial administrator)
- Henrietta Stockdale

=== T ===
- Jimmy Tau, football player and Kaizer Chiefs captain
- William M. Timlin, artist and architect, responsible for many notable Kimberley buildings.

=== W ===
- Charles Warren
- Maria Wilman
