= Bluegum House hyena trap =

The Bluegum House hyena trap is a provincial heritage site in Graaf-Reinet in the Eastern Cape province of South Africa.

In 1977 it was described in the Government Gazette as

This corbelled hyena trap was built to catch predators. It forms an important material link with the pioneering way of life in South Africa.

== Bibliography ==
- South African Heritage Resource Agency database
