= Benjamin Bennett =

Benjamin Bennett may refer to:

- Benjamin Bennett (governor), Governor of Bermuda, 1701–1713
- Benjamin Bennett (politician) (1872–1939), Australian politician
- Benjamin Bennett (writer) (1904–1985), South African crime writer
- Benjamin Bennett, an artist who performs Sitting and Smiling

== See also ==
- Benjamin Bennet (disambiguation)
