= Joseph Henyekane =

South African footballer

Personal information
- Date of birth: 20 October 1984
- Place of birth: Kimberley, South Africa
- Date of death: 16 December 2014 (aged 30)
- Place of death: Kimberley, South Africa
- Height: 1.76 m (5 ft 9 in)
- Position: Midfielder

Youth career
- Naughty Boys
- Basotho Tigers

Senior career*
| Years | Team | Apps | (Gls) |
| 2006–2010 | Golden Arrows | 11 | (0) |
| 2010–2011 | Black Aces | | |
| 2011 | Bidvest Wits | 21 | (0) |
| 2014 | Roses United | 1 | (0) |
| Total | | 33 | (0) |
- * Club domestic league appearances and goals

Joseph Henyekane (20 October 1984 – 16 December 2014) was a South African soccer player who played in the South African Premier Division for Bidvest Wits. Joseph died suddenly at his home in Kimberley after falling ill, four months before his brother, Richard, also died in a car accident.

== Career statistics ==
Appearances and goals by club, season and competition
| Club | Season | League | | | Cup | | Other | | Total | |
| Club | Season | Division | Apps | Goals | Apps | Goals | Apps | Goals | Apps | Goals |
|---|---|---|---|---|---|---|---|---|---|---|
| Lamontville Golden Arrows | 2009–10 | South African Premier Division | 11 | 0 | 0 | 0 | 0 | 0 | 11 | 0 |
| Bidvest Wits | 2010–11 | South African Premier Division | 21 | 0 | 0 | 0 | 0 | 0 | 21 | 0 |
| Roses United | 2013–14 | National First Division | 1 | 0 | 0 | 0 | 0 | 0 | 1 | 0 |
| Career total | | | 33 | 0 | 0 | 0 | 0 | 0 | 33 | 0 |
