= Kimberley, South Africa =

Capital of the Northern Cape, South Africa

Kimberley ǃ’Ās (Khoekhoe)
- City
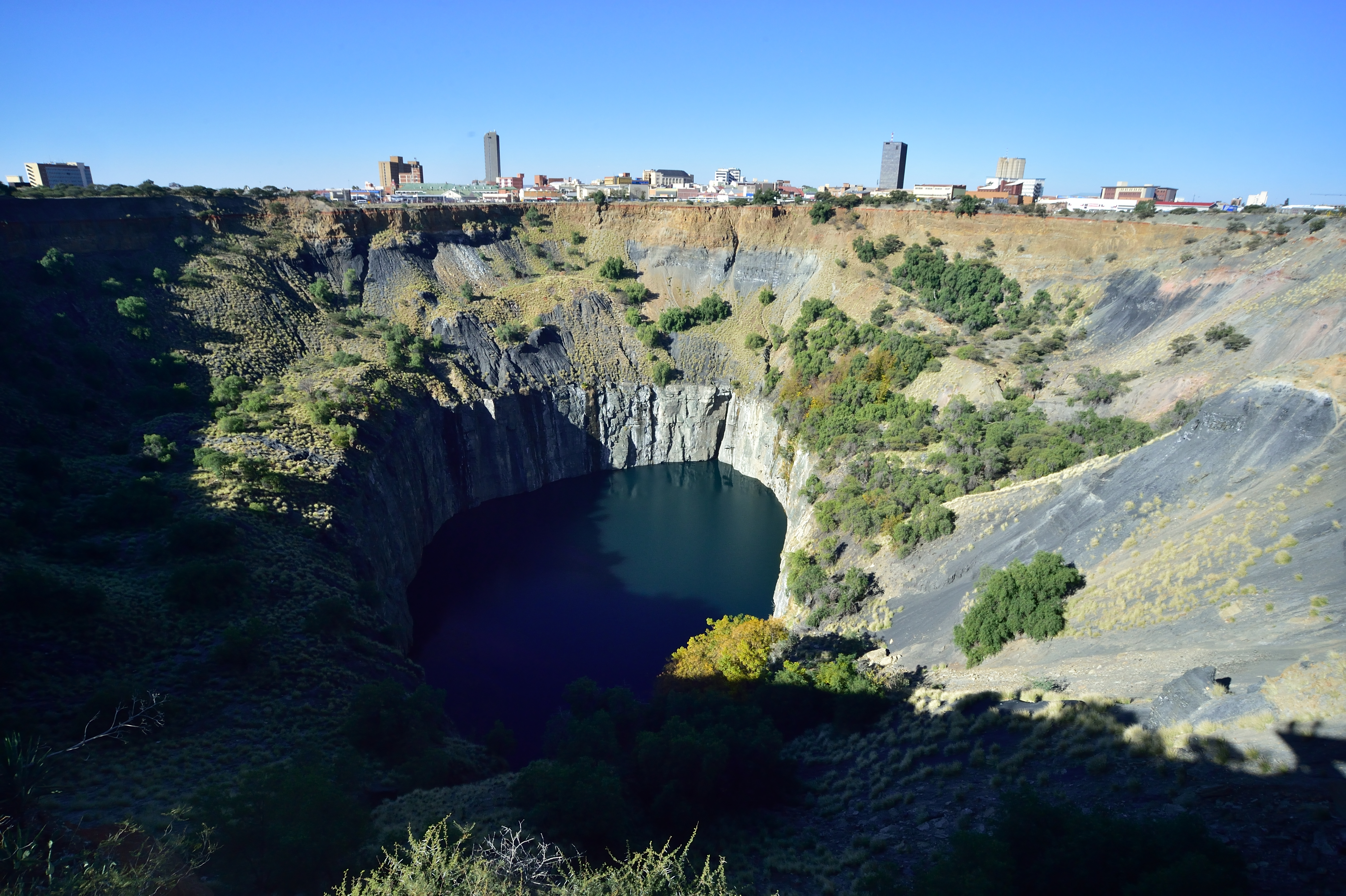
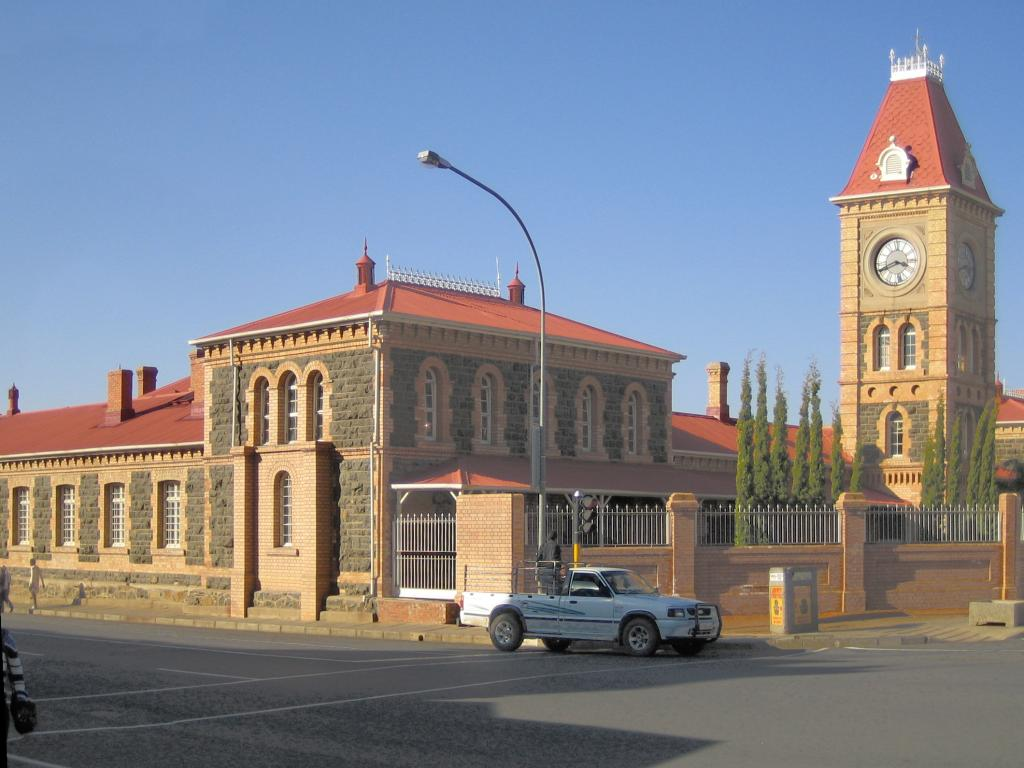
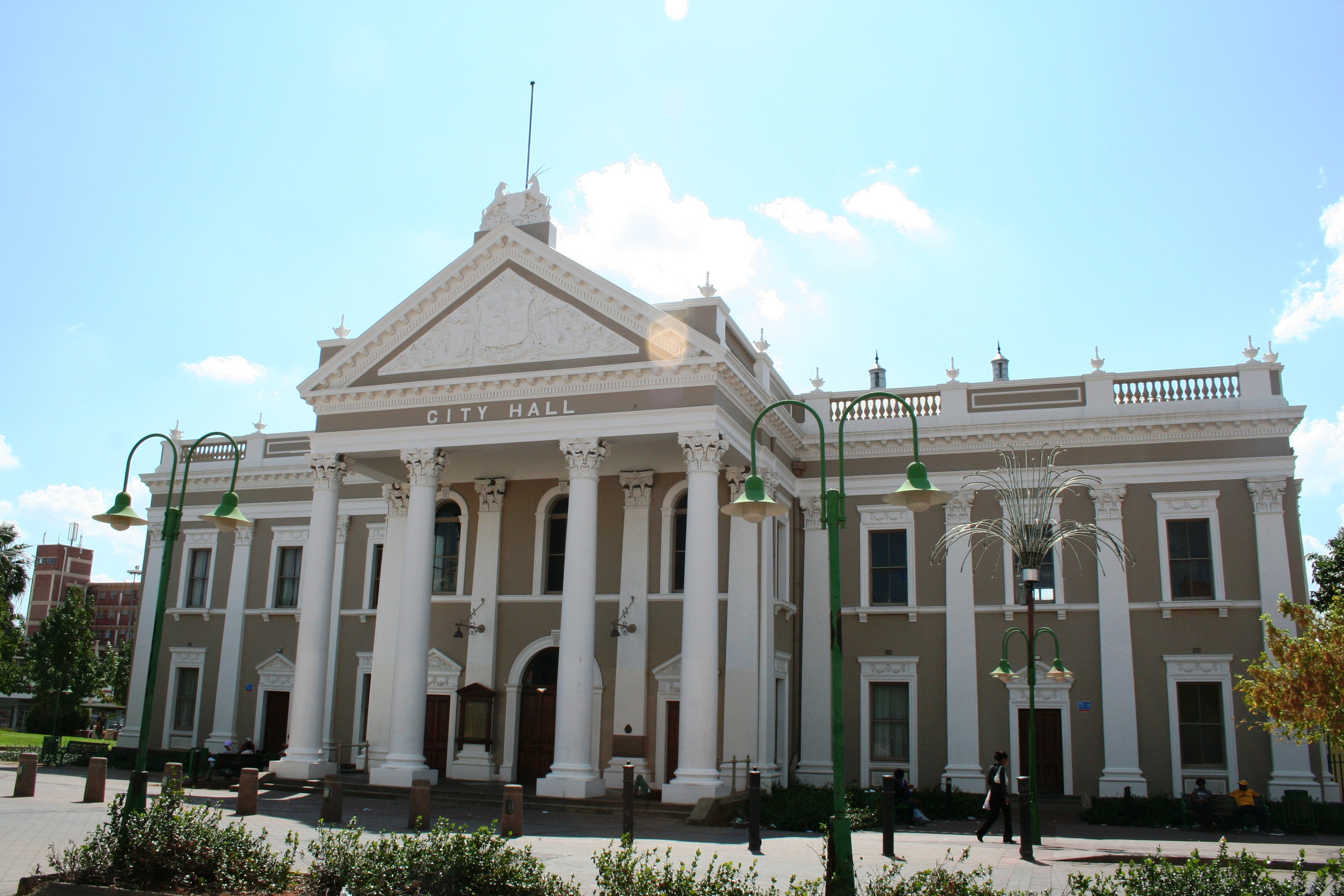
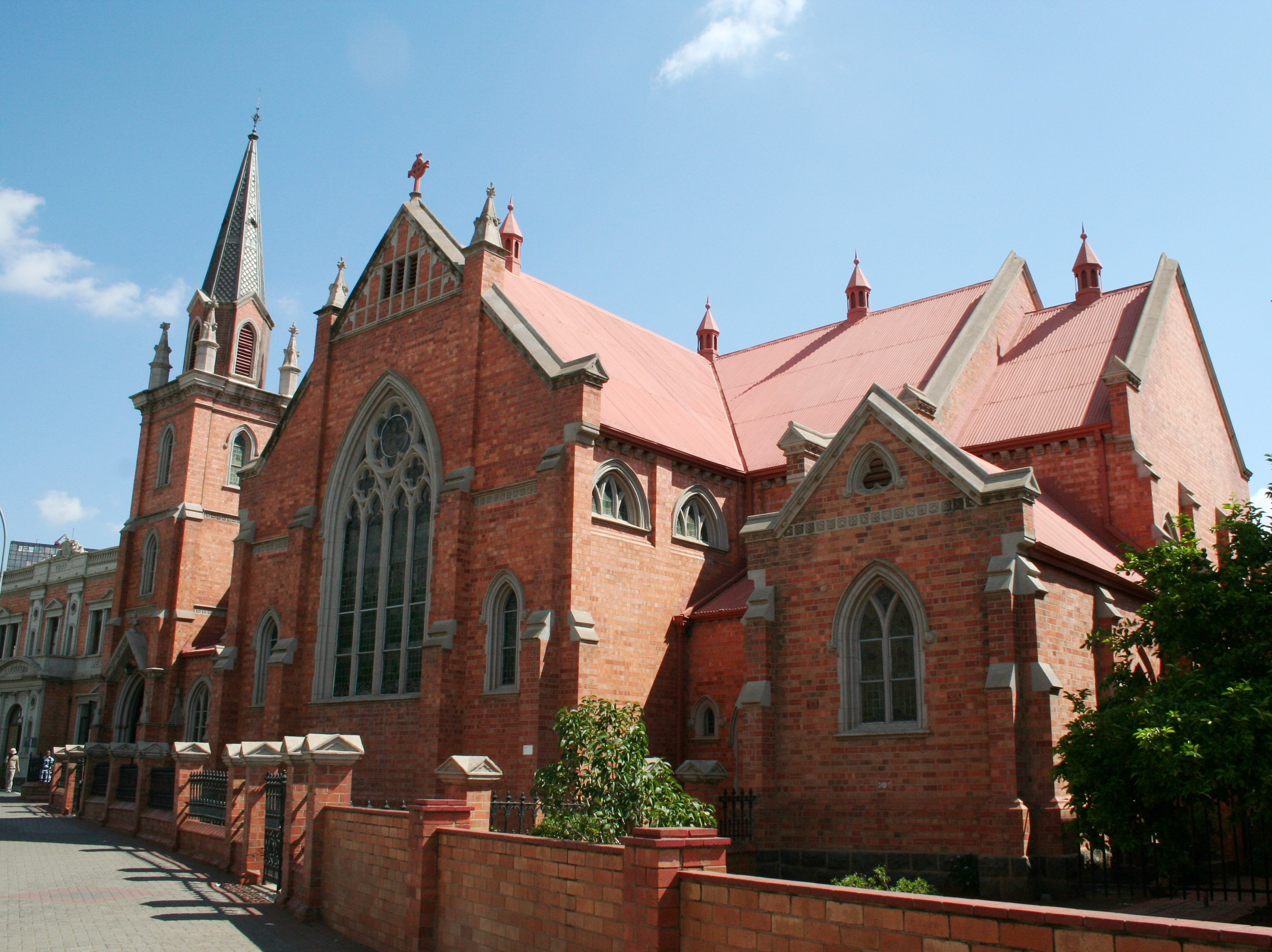
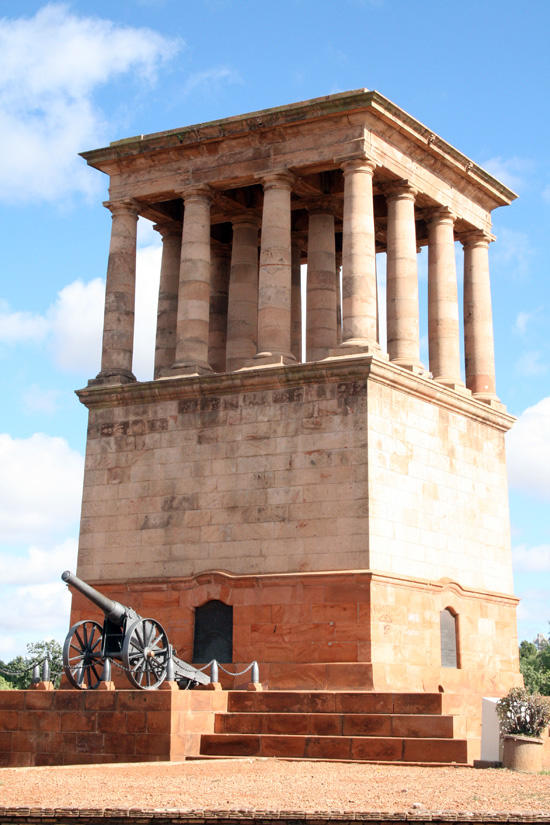
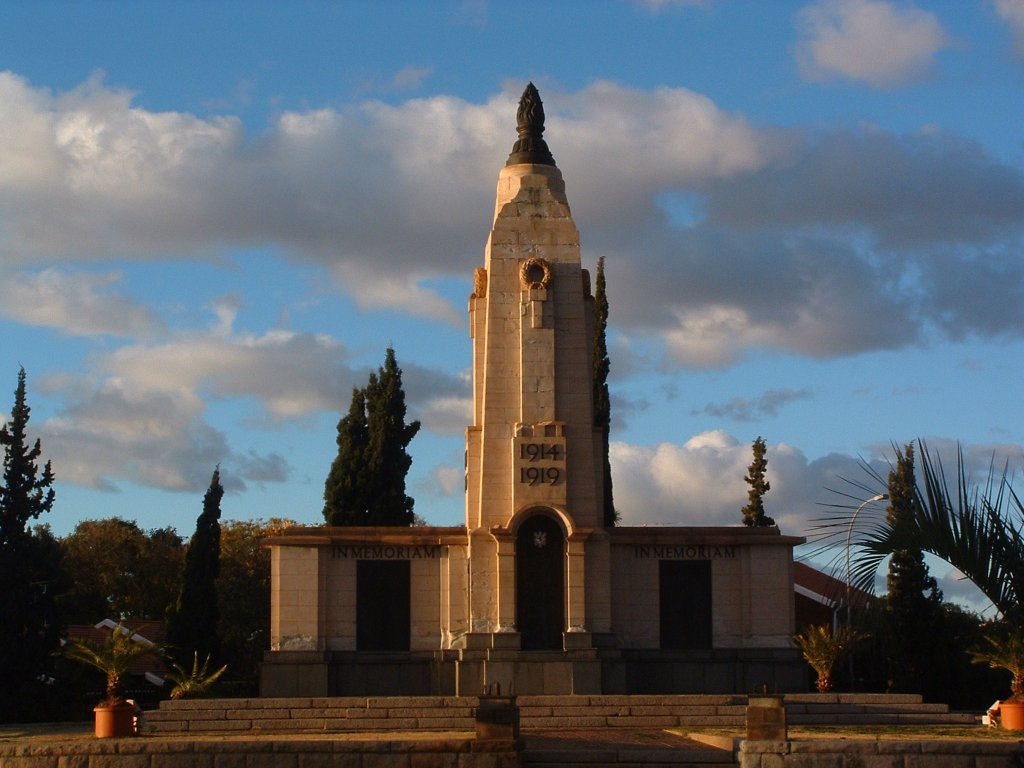
- Top: City centre seen over the Big Hole, Middle left: Griqualand West High Court, right: Kimberley Town Hall, bottom left: Trinity Church, Honoured Dead Memorial, World War I Memorial

- Location within Northern Cape Location within South Africa Location within Africa
- Coordinates: 28°44′18″S 24°45′50″E
- Country: South Africa
- Province: Northern Cape
- District: Frances Baard
- Municipality: Sol Plaatje
- Established: 5 July 1873; 153 years ago

Government
  - Mayor: Kagisho Dante Sonyoni (ANC)

Area
  - Total: 142.77 km^{2} (55.12 sq mi)
- Elevation: 1,184 m (3,885 ft)

Population (2011)
  - Total: 96,977
  - Density: 679.25/km^{2} (1,759.3/sq mi)

Racial makeup (2011)
  - Black African: 41.5%
  - Coloured: 36.7%
  - White: 18.4%
  - Indian/Asian: 2.3%
  - Other: 1.1%

First languages (2011)
  - Afrikaans: 55.5%
  - Tswana: 18.7%
  - English: 15.6%
  - Xhosa: 4.6%
  - Other: 5.6%
- Time zone: UTC+2 (SAST)
- Postal code (street): 8301
- PO box: 8300
- Area code: 053

Kimberley (Khoekhoe: ǃ’Ās; Tswana: Kimbali) is the capital and largest city of the Northern Cape province of South Africa. It is located about 110 km (68 mi) east of the confluence of the Vaal and Orange Rivers. The city has considerable historical significance because of its diamond-mining past and the siege during the Second Boer War. British businessmen Cecil Rhodes and Barney Barnato made their fortunes in Kimberley, and Rhodes also established the De Beers diamond company in the early days of the mining town.

On 2 September 1882, Kimberley became the first city in the Southern Hemisphere and the second in the world after Philadelphia, in the United States, to install electric street lighting. The first stock exchange in Africa was built in Kimberley as early as 1881.

== History ==
=== Discovery of diamonds ===
In 1866, Erasmus Jacobs found a small, brilliant pebble on the banks of the Orange River, on the farm De Kalk leased from local Griquas, near Hopetown, which was his father's farm. He showed the pebble to his father, who then sold it. The pebble was purchased from Jacobs' father by Schalk van Niekerk, who later sold it on again. It proved to be a 21.25-carat (4.3 g) diamond and became known as the Eureka. Three years later, an 83.5-carat (16.7 g) diamond, which became known as the Star of South Africa, was found nearby (29°3′S 23°58′E). This diamond was sold by van Niekerk for £11,200 (equivalent to R4,000,000 in 2018), and it later resold in the London market for £25,000.

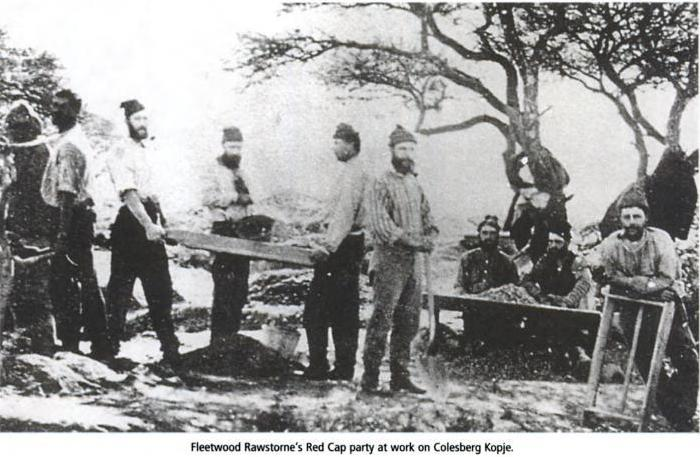
Fleetwood Rawstorne's "Red Cap Party" of prospectors on Colesberg Kopje

Henry Richard Giddy recounted how Esau Damoense (or Damon), the cook for prospector Fleetwood Rawstorne's "Red Cap Party", found diamonds in 1871 on Colesberg Kopje after he was sent there to dig as punishment. Rawstorne took the news to the nearby diggings of the De Beer brothers, his arrival there sparking off the famous "New Rush", which, as the historian Brian Roberts puts it, was practically a stampede. Within a month, 900 claims were cut into the hillock, which were worked frenetically by two to three thousand men. As the land was lowered, the hillock became a mine, in time the world-renowned Kimberley Mine.

The Cape Colony, Transvaal, Orange Free State, and Griqua leader Nicolaas Waterboer all laid claim to the diamond fields. The Free State Boers in particular wanted the area, as it lay inside the natural borders created by Orange and the Vaal Rivers. Following the mediation that was overseen by Robert William Keate, the governor of Natal, the Keate Award went in favour of Waterboer, who placed himself under British protection. Consequently, the territory known as Griqualand West was proclaimed on 27 October 1871.

=== Naming the place: from Vooruitzigt to New Rush to Kimberley ===
Colonial commissioners arrived in New Rush on 17 November 1871 to exercise authority over the territory on behalf of the Cape governor. Digger objections and minor riots led to Governor Barkly's visit to New Rush in September the following year, when he revealed a plan instead to have Griqualand West proclaimed a crown colony.

Richard Southey would arrive as lieutenant-governor of the intended crown colony in January 1873. Months passed, however, without any sign of the proclamation or of the promised new constitution and provision for representative government. The delay was in London, where Secretary of State for the Colonies, John Wodehouse, 1st Earl of Kimberley, insisted that before electoral divisions could be defined, the places had to receive "decent and intelligible names. His Lordship declined to be in any way connected with such a vulgarism as New Rush and as for the Dutch name, Vooruitzigt … he could neither spell nor pronounce it".

The matter was passed to Southey, who gave it to his Colonial Secretary J.B. Currey. Roberts wrote, "when it came to renaming New Rush, [Currey] proved himself a worthy diplomat. He made quite sure that Lord Kimberley would be able both to spell and pronounce the name of the main electoral division by, as he says, calling it 'after His Lordship'". New Rush became Kimberley by a proclamation dated 5 July 1873.

Digger sentiment was expressed in an editorial in the Diamond Field newspaper when it stated, "[we] went to sleep in New Rush and waked up in Kimberley, and so our dream was gone".

Following agreement by the British government on compensation to the Orange Free State for its competing land claims, Griqualand West was annexed to the Cape Colony in 1877.

The Cape Prime Minister John Molteno initially had serious doubts about annexing the heavily indebted region, but after striking a deal with the Home government and receiving assurances that the local population would be consulted in the process, he passed the Griqualand West Annexation Act on 27 July 1877.

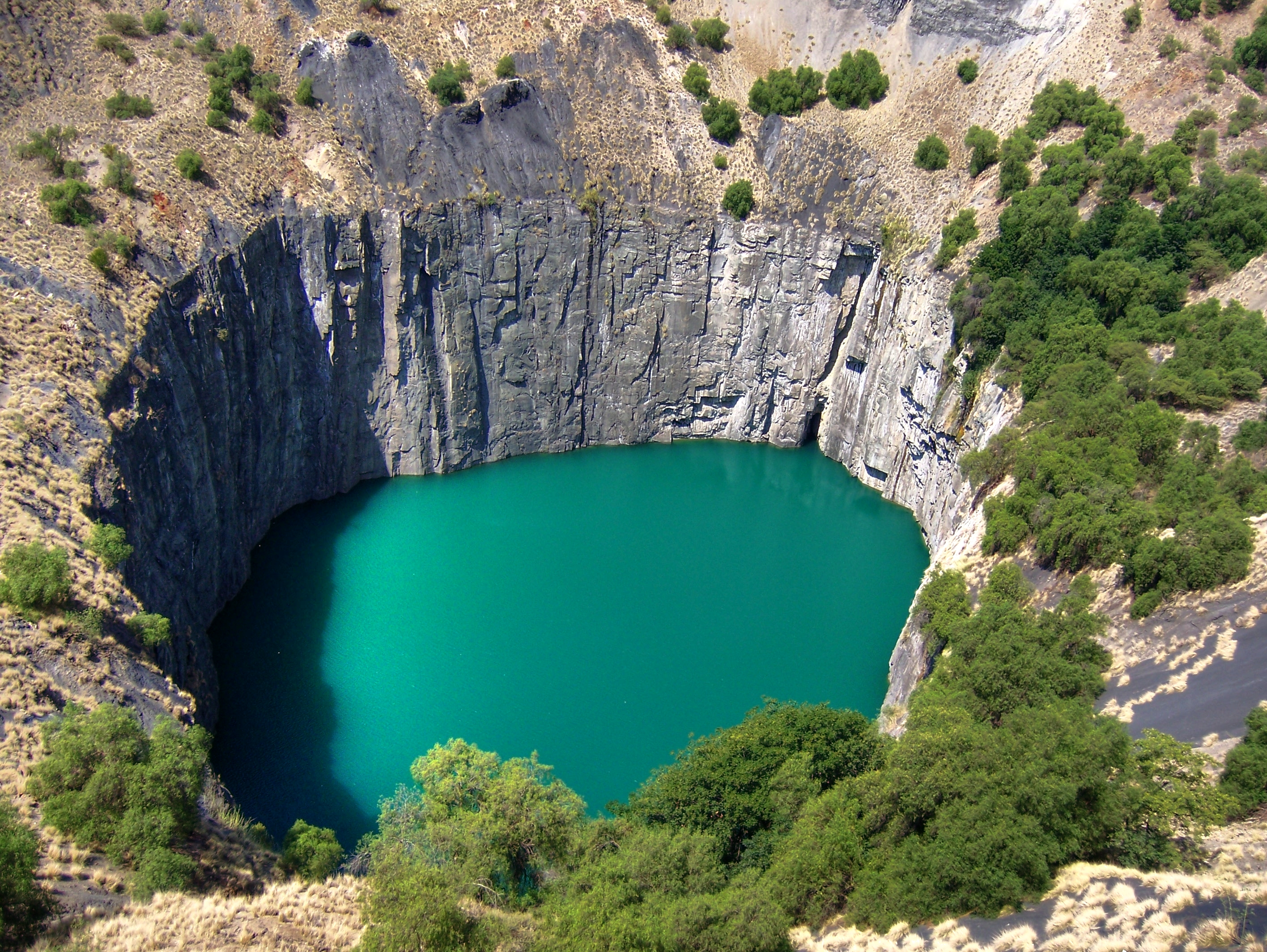
The Big Hole.

=== Big Hole and other mines ===
As miners arrived in their thousands, the hill disappeared and subsequently became known as the Big Hole (or Kimberley se Gat in Afrikaans), or, more formally, Kimberley Mine. From mid-July 1871 to 1914, 50,000 miners dug the hole with picks and shovels, yielding 2,722 kg of diamonds. The Big Hole has a surface of 17 hectares (42 acres) and is 463 metres wide. It was excavated to a depth of 240 m but then partially infilled with debris, reducing its depth to about 215 m. Since then, it has accumulated water to a depth of 40 m, leaving 175 m visible. Beneath the surface, the Kimberley Mine underneath the Big Hole was mined to a depth of 1097 m. A popular local myth claims that it is the largest hand-dug hole on the world, but Jagersfontein Mine appears to hold that record.

The Big Hole is the principal feature of a May 2004 submission that placed "Kimberley Mines and associated early industries" on UNESCO's World Heritage Tentative Lists.

By 1873, Kimberley was the second-largest town in South Africa, with an approximate population of 40,000.

=== Role and influence of De Beers ===
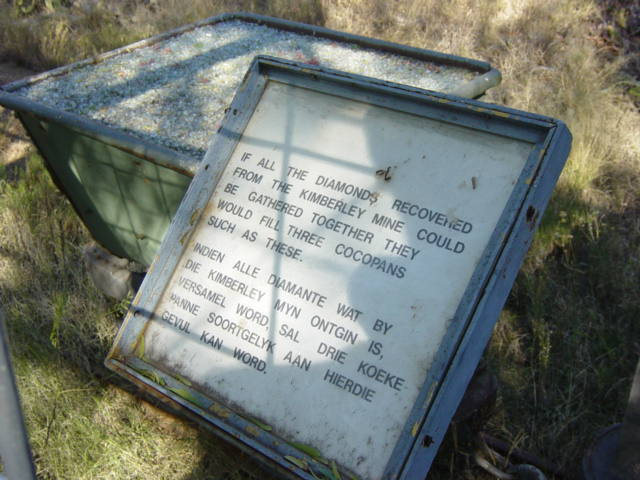
A sign next to the Big Hole, reading, "If all the diamonds recovered from the Kimberley Mine could be gathered together, they would fill three cocopans such as these."

The various smaller mining companies were amalgamated by Cecil Rhodes and Charles Rudd into De Beers, and The Kimberley under Barney Barnato. In 1888, the two companies merged to form De Beers Consolidated Mines, which once had a monopoly over the world's diamond market.

Very quickly, Kimberley became the largest city in the area, partly because of a massive African migration to the area from all over the continent. The immigrants were accepted with open arms, because the De Beers company was in search of cheap labour to help run the mines. Another group drawn to the city for money was prostitutes from a wide variety of ethnicities, who could be found in bars and saloons. It was praised as a city of limitless opportunity.

Five big holes were dug into the earth following the kimberlite pipes, which are named after the town. Kimberlite is a diamond-bearing blue ground that sits below a yellow-coloured soil. The largest, The Kimberley mine or "Big Hole" covering 170,000 square metres (42 acres), reached a depth of 240 metres (790 ft) and yielded three tons of diamonds. The mine was closed in 1914, while three of the holes – Dutoitspan, Wesselton, and Bultfontein – closed down in 2005.

=== Second Boer War ===
On 14 October 1899, Kimberley was besieged at the beginning of the Second Boer War. The British forces trying to relieve the siege suffered heavy losses. The siege was only lifted on 15 February 1900, but the war continued until May 1902. By that time, the British had built a concentration camp at Kimberley to house Boer women and children.

Soup ration ticket from the Siege of Kimberley

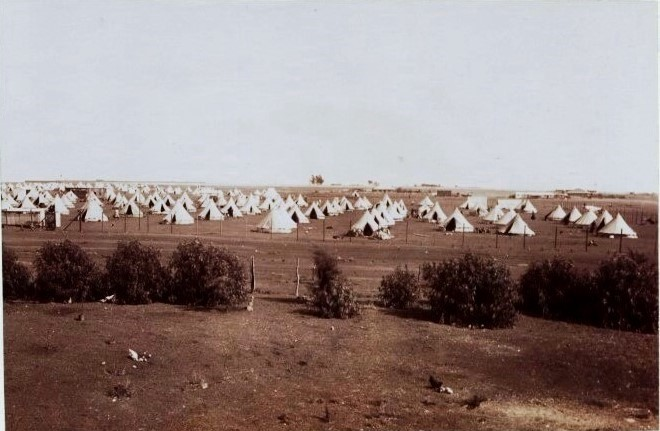
The British concentration camp at Kimberley, for Boers

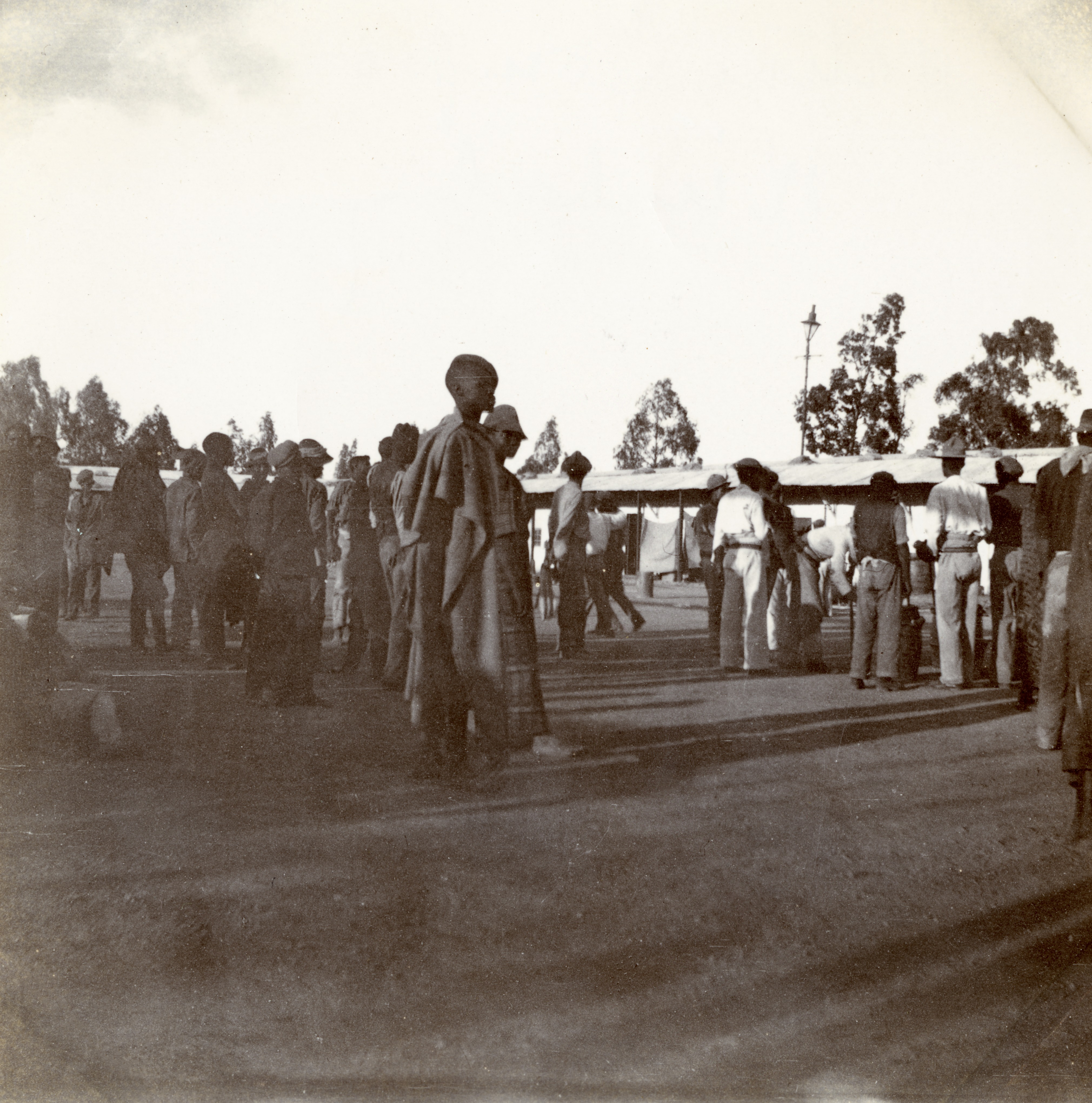
The camp for Blacks, c.1901

=== Amalgamation ===
The hitherto separately administered Boroughs of Kimberley and Beaconsfield amalgamated as the City of Kimberley in 1912.

=== Under apartheid ===
Although a considerable degree of urban segregation already existed, one of the most significant impacts of apartheid on the city of Kimberley was the implementation of the Group Areas Act. Communities were divided according to legislated racial categories: European (White), Native (Black), Coloured, and Indian, and legally separated by the Prohibition of Mixed Marriages Act. Individual families could be split up to three ways (based on such notorious measures as the pencil test), and mixed communities were either completely relocated (as in Malay Camp – although those clearances began before apartheid as such) – or were selectively cleared (as in Greenpoint, which became a 'Coloured' Group Area, its erstwhile-African and other residents being removed to other parts of town).

Residential segregation was thus enforced in a process that saw the creation of new townships at the northern and north-eastern edges of the expanding city. Institutions that were hard hit by the Group Areas Act, Bantu Education and other Acts included churches (such as the Bean Street Methodist Church) and schools (some, such as William Pescod and Perseverance School, moved, while the Gore Browne (Native) Training School was closed down). Other legislation restricted the movement of Africans and some public places became 'Europeans Only' preserves in terms of the Reservation of Separate Amenities Act. The Native Laws Amendment Act sought to cleave church communities along racial lines, a law rejected on behalf of all Anglicans in South Africa by Archbishop Clayton in 1957 (in terms of which that aspect of apartheid was never completely implemented in churches such as Kimberley's St Cyprian's Cathedral).

Resistance to apartheid in Kimberley was mounted as early as mid-1952, as part of the Defiance Campaign. Dr Arthur Letele put together a group of volunteers to defy the segregation laws by occupying Europeans Only benches at Kimberley Railway Station, which led to arrest and imprisonment. Later that year, the Mayibuye Uprising in Kimberley, on 8 November 1952, revolved around the poor quality of beer served in the beer hall. The fracas resulted in shootings and a subsequent mass funeral on 12 November 1952 at Kimberley's West End Cemetery. Detained following the massacre were alleged "ring-leaders" Dr Letele, Sam Phakedi, Pepys Madibane, Olehile Sehume, Alexander Nkoane, Daniel Chabalala, and David Mpiwa. Archdeacon Wade of St Matthew's Church, as a witness at the subsequent inquiry, placed the blame squarely on the policy of apartheid, including poor housing, lighting, and public transport, together with "unfulfilled promises", which he said "brought about the conditions which led to the riots".

A later generation of anti-apartheid activists based in Kimberley included Phakamile Mabija, Bishop Graham Chadwick, and two postapartheid provincial premiers, Manne Dipico and Dipuo Peters. Other prominent figures of the struggle against apartheid who had Kimberley connections include Robert Sobukwe, founder of the Pan Africanist Congress, who was banished (placed under house arrest) in Kimberley after his release from Robben Island in 1969. He died in the city in 1978.

Benny Alexander (1955–2010), who later changed his name to Khoisan X and was general secretary of the Pan Africanist Congress and of the Pan-Africanist Movement from 1989, was born and grew up in Kimberley.

=== Post-apartheid ===
The Northern Cape Province became a political fact in 1994 with Kimberley as its capital. Some quasi-provincial infrastructure was in place from the 1940s, but after 1994, Kimberley underwent considerable development as administrative departments were set up and housed for the governance of the new province. A Northern Cape Legislature was designed and situated to bridge the formerly divided city. The Kimberley City Council of the renamed Sol Plaatje Local Municipality (see below) was enlarged. A new coat of arms and motto for the city were ushered in.

With the abolition of apartheid previously "whites only" institutions, such as schools, became accessible to all, as did suburbs previously segregated by the Group Areas Act. In practice, the process has been one of upward mobility by those who could afford the more costly options, but the vast majority of black people remain in the townships, where poverty levels are high.

Major township residential developments, with RDP housing, were implemented not without criticism concerning quality. There has been an increase in Kimberley's population since urbanization has been spurred on in part by the abolition of the Influx Control Act.

Also, the settlement of Platfontein was added when the !Xun and Khwe community, formerly of Schmidtsdrift and originally from Angola/Namibia, acquired the land in 1996. Most of the newly created community had moved to the new township by the end of 2003.

In 1998, the Kimberley Comprehensive Urban Plan estimated that Kimberley had 210,800 people, representing 46,207 households living in the city.

By 2008, estimates were in the region of 250,000 inhabitants.

==== Renaming ====
The shifts from frontier farm names to digger camp names to the established names of the towns of Kimberley and Beaconsfield, which duly amalgamated in 1912, are outlined above. The only traces of any precolonial settlement within the city's boundaries are scatters of Stone Age artefacts and there is no record of what the place/s might have been called before the first nineteenth century frontier overlay of farm names. It lay beyond the areas occupied by Tswana people in the precolonial period. Sites such as the nearby Wildebeest Kuil testify to a Khoe–San history dating up into the nineteenth century.

In the post-1994 era the Kimberley City Council was renamed the Sol Plaatje Local Municipality after the area it served was expanded to include surrounding towns and villages, most notably Ritchie. Sol Plaatje, the prominent writer and activist, lived for much of his life in Kimberley. Similarly the erstwhile Diamantveld District Council became the Frances Baard District Municipality, with reference to the trade unionist, Frances Baard, who was born in Greenpoint, Kimberley.

== Coats of arms ==
Municipality – The Kimberley borough council assumed a coat of arms in 1878. (Note: The arms are depicted on an illuminated address presented to governor Sir Bartle Frere in 1879 and one presented to the governor, Sir Henry Brougham Loch, in 1890.) The arms were registered with the Cape Provincial Administration in December 1964 and at the Bureau of Heraldry in February 1968.

The design was a combination of the Union Jack and the charges from the Cape Colony's coat of arms, with a lozenge to represent the diamond-mining industry : Azure, a cross and saltire superimposed Gules both fimbriated Argent, in chief three bezants Or, each charged with a fleur de lis Azure, and in base three annulets Or; on a lozenge Or, superimposed over the fess point, a lion rampant Gules. The motto was Spero meliora. The arms were depicted on a cigarette card issued in 1931.

The Kimberley divisional council, which administered the rural areas outside the city, registered its own arms at the Bureau in August 1970.

The arms were Per saltire, in chief, barry wavy of six Argent and Azure; in base, Argent, a pale Sable charged with three fusils Argent; dexter, Gules, a shovel and pick in saltire, handles downward, Or; sinister, a staff of Aesculapius, Or. In layman's terms, the shield was divided in four by two diagonal lines, and depicted (1) six silver and blue stripes with wavy edges, (2) a crossed pick and shovel on a red background, (3) a golden staff of Aesculapius, and (4) three silver diamond-shaped fusils on a black vertical stripe on a silver background.

The crest was two crossed rifles in front of an upright sword; the supporters were two kudus; and the motto was "Nitanir semper ad optima".

== Economy ==
Kimberley was the initial hub of industrialisation in South Africa in the late 19th century, which transformed the country's agrarian economy into one more dependent on its mineral wealth. A key feature of the new economic arrangement was migrant labour, with the demand for African labour in the mines of Kimberley and later on the gold fields drawing workers in growing numbers from throughout the subcontinent. The labour compound system, developed in Kimberley from the 1880s, was later replicated on the gold mines and elsewhere.

The city housed South Africa's first stock exchange, the Kimberley Royal Stock Exchange, which opened on 2 February 1881.

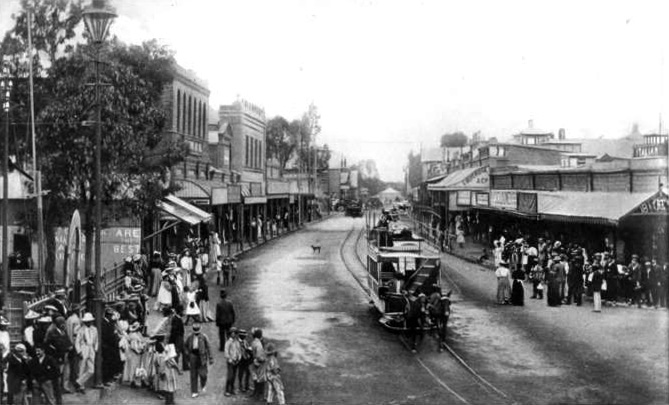
Du Toit's Pan Road Kimberley, 1899

On 2 September 1882, Kimberley became the first town in the Southern Hemisphere to install electric street lighting. The only city in the world to so earlier was Philadelphia, in the United States.

The rising importance of Kimberley led to one of the earliest South African and International Exhibitions to be staged in Kimberley in 1892. It was opened by Sir Henry Loch, the then Governor of the Cape of Good Hope on 8 September. It presented exhibits of art, an exhibition of paintings from the royal collection of Queen Victoria and mining machinery and implements amongst other items. The exhibition aroused considerable interest at international level, which resulted in a competition for display space.

South Africa's first school of mines was opened here in 1896 and later relocated to Johannesburg, becoming the core of the University of the Witwatersrand. A Pretoria campus later became the University of Pretoria. In fact the first two years were attended at colleges elsewhere, in Cape Town, Grahamstown or Stellenbosch, the third year in Kimberley and the fourth year in Johannesburg. Buildings were constructed against a total cost of 9,000 pounds with De Beers contributing on a pound for pound basis.

=== Transport ===
==== Aviation ====
South Africa's first school of aviation, to train pilots for the proposed South African Aviation Corps (SAAC), was established in Kimberley in 1913. Known as Paterson's Aviation Syndicate School of Flying, it is commemorated in the Pioneers of Aviation Museum (and replica of the first Compton Patterson Biplane preserved there), situated near to Kimberley airport. In the 1930s Kimberley boasted the best night-landing facilities on the continent of Africa. A major air rally was hosted there in 1934. In the war years Kimberley Airport was commandeered by the Union Defence Force and run by the 21 Flying School for the training of fighter pilots.

Today Kimberley Airport (IATA: KIM, ICAO: FAKM) services the area, with regular scheduled flights from Cape Town and Johannesburg.

==== Railways ====
Work on connecting Kimberley by rail to the cities along the Cape Colony's coastline began in 1872, under the management of the Cape Government Railways. The railway line from Cape Town to Kimberley was completed in 1885, accelerating the transport of both passengers and goods. The railway connected Kimberley with cheaper sources of grain and other products, as well as supplies of coal, so that one of its local impacts was to undercut (mainly African) trade in fresh produce and firewood in Kimberley's hinterland. Another footnote to railway history is its role in the initial rapid spread of the Spanish Influenza epidemic in 1918.

The railway reticulation eventually would link Kimberley with Port Elizabeth, Johannesburg, Durban and Bloemfontein. The major junction at De Aar in the Karoo linked early twentieth century lines to Upington (later to Namibia) and to Calvinia. From the 1990s there was a decline in the use of the railways.

Today passenger train services to and from Kimberley are provided by Spoornet's Shosholoza Meyl, with connections south to Cape Town and Port Elizabeth and north to Johannesburg. Luxury railway experiences are provided on the main north–south line by the Blue Train and Rovos Rail. The central railway station of Kimberley is Kimberley railway station.

==== Roads ====
Wagon and coach routes were developed rapidly as the rush for the diamond fields gathered momentum. Two of the major routes were from the Cape and from Port Elizabeth, the nearest maritime port at the time. Contemporary accounts of the 1870s describe the appalling condition of some of the roads and decry the absence of bridges. From the mid-1880s the route through Kimberley and Mafeking (now Mahikeng) became the main axis of British colonial penetration and it was from Kimberley, along that route, that the Pioneer Column for the settlement of Rhodesia set forth in 1890. Today, however, the central arterial route to the north, the N1 from the Cape to Johannesburg, goes via Bloemfontein, not Kimberley.

Kimberley is located at the intersection of the N12 and N8 national roads.

=== Today ===
Today, Kimberley is the seat of the Provincial Legislature for the Northern Cape and the Provincial Administration. It services the mining and agricultural sectors of the region.

==== Tourism ====
The city projects itself as a significant tourist destination, the 'City that Sparkles', boasting a diversity of museums and visitor attractions. It is also a gateway to other Northern Cape destinations including the Mokala National Park, nature reserves and numerous game farms or hunting lodges, as well as historic sites of the region.

==== Conference-hosting ====
Kimberley has hosted significant meetings and conferences, developing a major venue, the Mittah Seperepere Convention Centre, and other conference hosting facilities. Recent gatherings have included the founding meeting of the Kimberley Process (2000) and a follow-up meeting of this organisation in 2013, and the International Indigenous Peoples Summit on Sustainable Development (2002).

== Climate and geography ==
=== Climate ===
Under the Köppen system Kimberley has a semi-arid climate (BSh) courtesy of its dry winters. Summers are long, wet, and long lasting. Winters are short, mild, and dry with chilly nights.

Climate data for Kimberley, elevation 1,196 m (3,924 ft), (1991–2020 normals, extremes 1877–present)
Month	Jan	Feb	Mar	Apr	May	Jun	Jul	Aug	Sep	Oct	Nov	Dec	Year
Record high °C (°F)	43.3 (109.9)	43.6 (110.5)	38.2 (100.8)	37.5 (99.5)	31.1 (88.0)	27.8 (82.0)	27.2 (81.0)	31.6 (88.9)	36.6 (97.9)	42.3 (108.1)	39.2 (102.6)	40.9 (105.6)	43.6 (110.5)
Mean daily maximum °C (°F)	32.7 (90.9)	31.9 (89.4)	28.9 (84.0)	25.9 (78.6)	22.6 (72.7)	19.5 (67.1)	19.5 (67.1)	22.2 (72.0)	26.6 (79.9)	29.4 (84.9)	31.0 (87.8)	32.7 (90.9)	27.0 (80.6)
Daily mean °C (°F)	25.0 (77.0)	24.5 (76.1)	22.3 (72.1)	18.1 (64.6)	14.1 (57.4)	10.7 (51.3)	10.5 (50.9)	13.0 (55.4)	17.2 (63.0)	20.5 (68.9)	22.4 (72.3)	24.3 (75.7)	18.5 (65.3)
Mean daily minimum °C (°F)	17.3 (63.1)	17.1 (62.8)	14.6 (58.3)	10.2 (50.4)	5.6 (42.1)	1.8 (35.2)	1.4 (34.5)	3.7 (38.7)	7.7 (45.9)	11.6 (52.9)	13.8 (56.8)	15.9 (60.6)	10.0 (50.0)
Record low °C (°F)	5.7 (42.3)	5.6 (42.1)	2.0 (35.6)	−2.8 (27.0)	−5.7 (21.7)	−8.4 (16.9)	−9.9 (14.2)	−8.5 (16.7)	−5.5 (22.1)	−0.7 (30.7)	2.2 (36.0)	3.8 (38.8)	−9.9 (14.2)
Average precipitation mm (inches)	72.9 (2.87)	67.4 (2.65)	62.2 (2.45)	38.6 (1.52)	15.2 (0.60)	8.6 (0.34)	2.6 (0.10)	3.8 (0.15)	9.9 (0.39)	31.1 (1.22)	39.3 (1.55)	52.2 (2.06)	404.3 (15.92)
Average precipitation days (≥ 1.0 mm)	7.1	5.9	6.1	4.4	2.1	1.0	0.6	0.8	1.1	3.6	4.7	6.3	44.0
Average relative humidity (%)	45	53	57	59	54	53	48	41	36	40	42	42	47
Mean monthly sunshine hours	291.1	244.3	268.3	262.2	270.6	263.3	278.7	296.5	274.4	295.4	301.9	313.3	3,360
Source 1: NOAA, Deutscher Wetterdienst (June record high, November record low), Meteo Climat (record highs and lows)
Source 2: South African Weather Service

Kimberley

Climate chart (precipitation, max. and min. temperature)
J	F	M	A	M	J	J	A	S	O	N	D
57 33 18	76 31 17	65 29 15	49 25 11	16 21 7	7 18 3	7 19 3	7 21 5	12 26 9	30 28 12	42 30 15	46 32 17
- █ Average max. and min. temperatures in °C
- █ Precipitation totals in mm
- Source: SAWS
Imperial conversion
J	F	M	A	M	J	J	A	S	O	N	D
2.2 91 64	3 88 63	2.6 84 59	1.9 77 52	0.6 70 45	0.3 64 37	0.3 66 37	0.3 70 41	0.5 79 48	1.2 82 54	1.7 86 59	1.8 90 63
- █ Average max. and min. temperatures in °F
- █ Precipitation totals in inches

=== Water ===
Kimberley's water is pumped from the Vaal River at Riverton, some 15 km north of the city.

=== Districts/Suburbs/Townships ===
- Albertynshof
- Ashburnham
- Beaconsfield
- Belgravia
- Carters Glen
- Cassandra
- Colville
- De Beers
- Diamant Park
- Du Toit's Pan
- El Torro Park
- Ernestville
- Floors/Florianville
- Galeshewe incl "Old No 2"
- Gemdene
- Greenpoint
- Greenside
- Hadison Park
- Herlear
- Heuwelsig
- Hillcrest
- Homelite
- Homestead
- Homevale
- Kenilworth
- Kestellhof
- Kimberley North
- Kirstenhof
- Klisserville
- Labram
- Lindene
- Lerato Park
- Malay Camp
- Minerva Gardens
- Mint Village
- Moghul Park
- Monument Heights
- Newton
- New Park
- Platfontein
- Rhodesdene
- Riviera
- Roodepan/Pescodia
- Royldene
- RoylGlen
- Southridge
- Squarehill Park
- Vergenoeg
- Verwoerd Park
- West End

=== Demography ===
According to the 2011 census, the population of Kimberley "proper" was 96,977, while the townships Galeshewe and Roodepan had populations of 107,920 and 20,263 respectively. This gives the urban area a total population of 225,160. Of this population, 63.1% identified themselves as "Black African", 26.8% as "Coloured", 8.0% as "White" and 1.2% as "Indian or Asian". 43.2% of the population spoke Afrikaans as their first language, 35.8% spoke Setswana, 8.7% spoke English, 6.0% spoke isiXhosa and 2.7% spoke Sesotho.

=== Landscapes, urban and rural ===
Kimberley is set in a relatively flat landscape with no prominent topographic features within the urban limits. The only "hills" are debris dumps generated by more than a century of diamond mining. From the 1990s these were being recycled and poured back into De Beers Mine (by 2010 it was filled to within a few tens of metres of the surface). Certain of the mine dumps, in the vicinity of the Big Hole, have been proclaimed as heritage features and are to be preserved as part of the historic industrial landscape of Kimberley.

The surrounding rural landscape, not more than a few minutes' drive from any part of the city, consists of relatively flat plains dotted with hills, mainly outcropping basement rock (andesite) to the north and north west, or Karoo age dolerite to the south and east. Shallow pans formed in the plains.

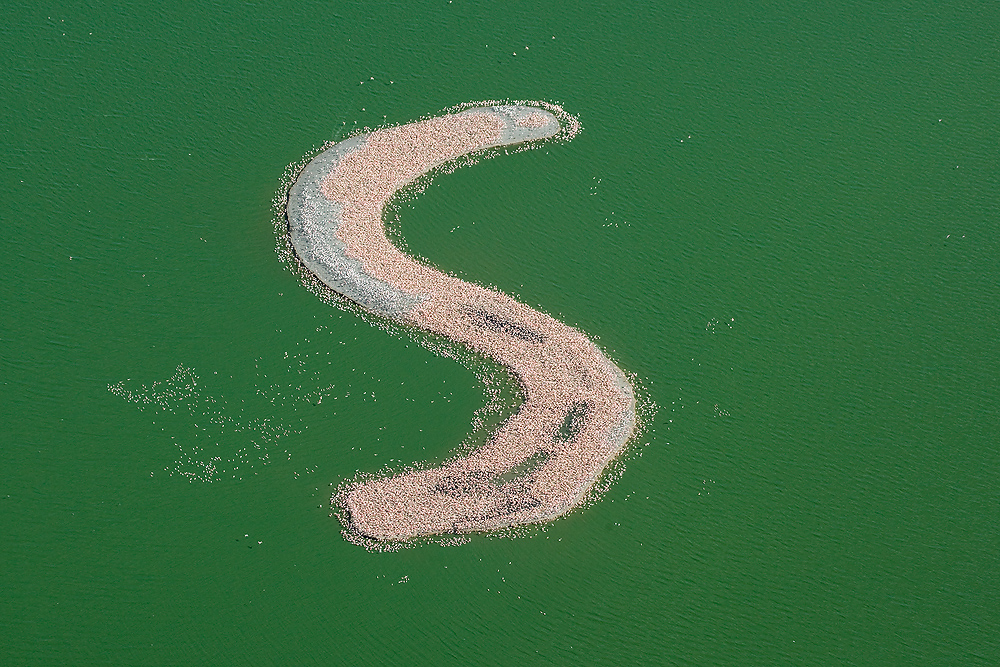
Flamingos on an artificial island in Kamfers Dam. This feature was submerged for a time as water levels rose in 2012

One of Kimberley's famous features is Kamfers Dam, a large pan north of the city, which is an important wetland supporting a breeding colony of lesser flamingos. Conservation initiatives in the area aim to bring people from the city in touch with its wildlife. In 2012 rising water levels flooded the artificial island built to enhance flamingo breeding, while in December 2013 a local outbreak of avian botulism bacteria resulted in the deaths of hundreds of birds. The island has since re-emerged.

== Local and provincial government ==
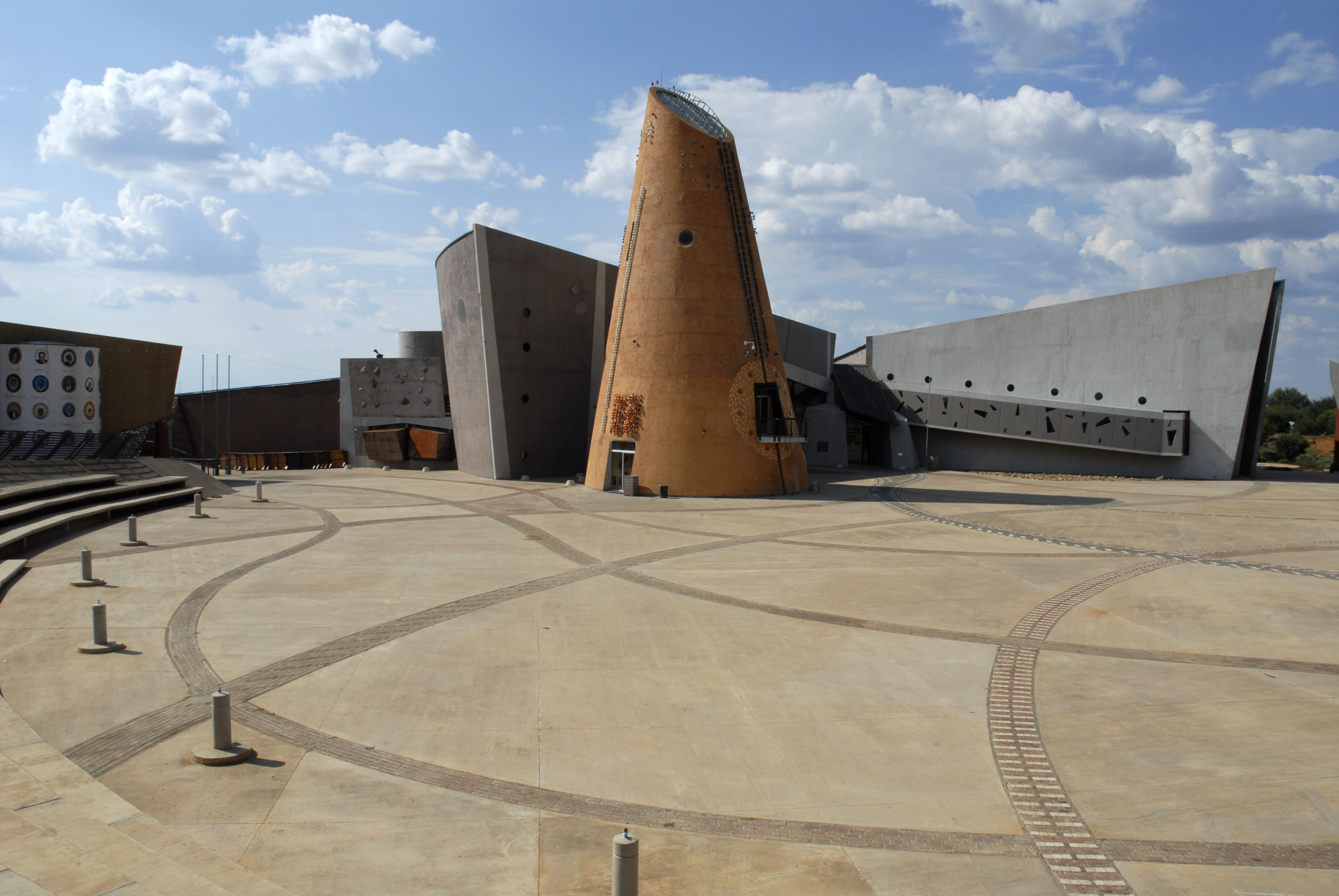
The provincial legislature is situated in the Galeshewe township of Kimberlely

The administration of the Crown Colony of Griqualand West (from 1873) was conducted from Government Buildings in Kimberley up until the annexation of the Colony to the Cape in 1880. At the level of local government, separate Borough Councils operated in Kimberley and Beaconsfield up to the time of their amalgamation as the City of Kimberley in 1912. Thereafter a single City Council regulated the affairs of the city, while a Divisional Council administered the surrounding rural district. In the 1980s, in the last days of apartheid, a separate political entity referred to as Galeshewe (with Mankurwane) was brought into existence with its own council.

Post-1994 the Kimberley City Council became the Sol Plaatje Local Municipality while the successor to what had become the Diamandveld Regional Services Council was the Frances Baard District Municipality.

The idea of establishing the Northern Cape as a distinct geographic entity dates from the 1940s but it became a political and administrative fact only in 1994, with Kimberley formally becoming the new province's legislative capital. The provincial legislature initially occupied the old Cape Provincial Administration building at the Civic Centre before moving into a purpose-built Legislature deliberately situated between one of the townships and erstwhile white suburbs. Kimberley is also the seat of the Northern Cape Division of the High Court of South Africa, which exercises jurisdiction over the province.

== Education ==
Education is a major sector in Kimberley's social and economic life.

=== Primary education ===
- Kimberley Junior School
- St Cyprian's Grammar School

=== Secondary education ===
- Adamantia High School
- Diamantveld High School
- Floors High School
- Greenpoint High School
- Homevale Secondary High School
- HTS Kimberley
- Kimberley Boys' High School
- Kimberley Girls' High School
- Northern Cape High School
- St. Boniface High School
- Christian Brothers College
- William Pescod High School

=== Tertiary education ===
- Qualitas Career Academy, (Private college). Offers full-time and part-time studies for students, and corporate training and consulting services for businesses and government departments.

==== Sol Plaatje University ====
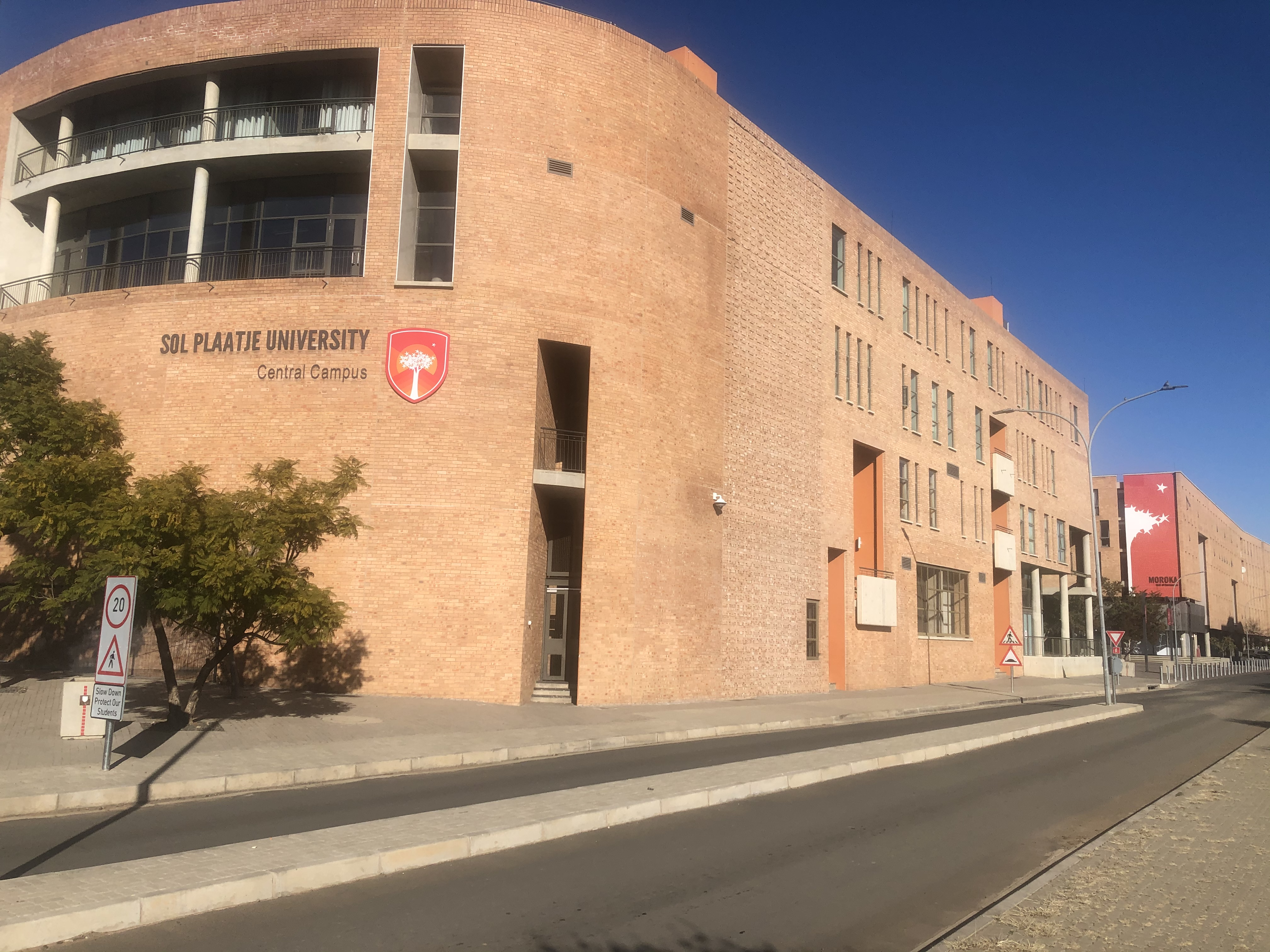
Sol Plaatjie University Central Campus, part of which is still under construction.

The Sol Plaatje University opened in Kimberley in 2014, accommodating a modest initial intake of 135 students. Announcing the name for the university, former President Jacob Zuma mentioned the development of academic niche areas that did not exist elsewhere, or were under-represented, in South Africa. "Given the rich heritage of Kimberley and the Northern Cape in general", Zuma said, "it is envisaged that Sol Plaatje will specialise in heritage studies, including interconnected academic fields such as museum management, archaeology, indigenous languages, and restoration architecture".

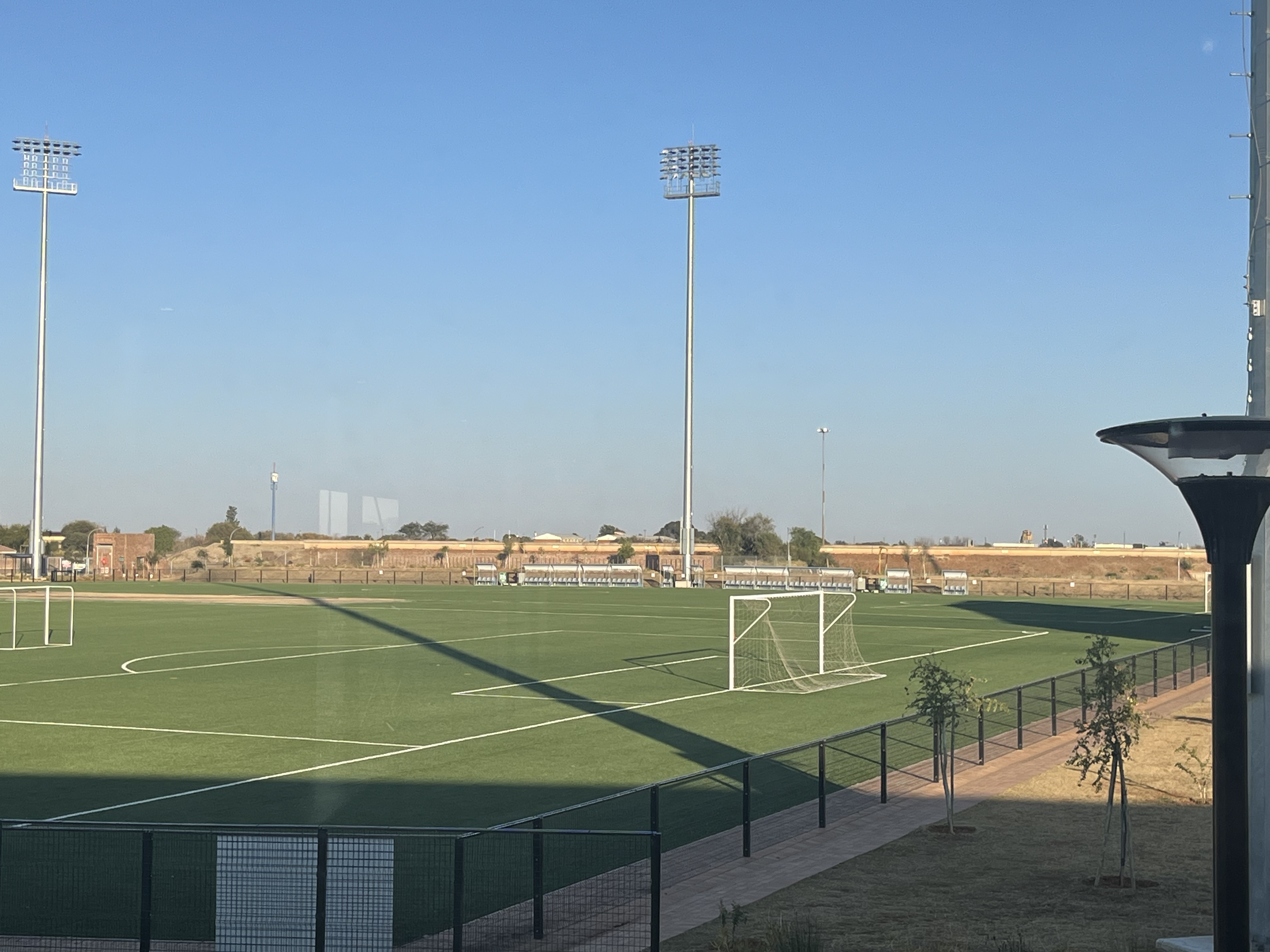
Sportsground at Sol Plaatje University, South Campus.

==== Defunct tertiary institutions ====
Tertiary education institutions no longer in existence (or absorbed into the above organisational configurations):

- Perseverance Teachers' Training College

== Society and culture ==
=== Religion ===
Kimberley, from its earliest days, attracted people of diverse faiths, which are still reflected by practising faith communities in the city. Pre-eminently these are various denominations of Christianity, Islam, Judaism, Hinduism, as well as other faiths. Traditional African beliefs continue as an element in the Zionist Christian Church (ZCC). Kimberley is the seat of the Anglican Diocese of Kimberley and Kuruman and also of the Roman Catholic Diocese of Kimberley – previously the Apostolic Vicariate of Kimberley in Orange. Other denominations having churches in the city are the Methodist Church, the Presbyterian Church, the Congregational Church, the Dutch Reformed Church (Afrikaans: Nederduitse Gereformeerde Kerk), the Baptist Church, the Afrikaans Baptist Church (Afrikaans: Afrikaanse Baptiste Kerk), the Apostolics, Pentecostals. The Seventh-day Adventist Church in South Africa was first established in Kimberley.

=== Art, music, film and literature ===
Notable artists from Kimberley include William Timlin and Walter Westbrook, while an artist noted for his depiction of Kimberley was Philip Bawcombe.

Writers from the city or with strong Kimberley links include Diane Awerbuck, Benjamin Bennett, Lawrence Green, Dorian Haarhoff, Dan Jacobson, E P Lekhela, Z.K. Matthews, Sarah Gertrude Millin, Sol Plaatje, Frank Templeton Prince, Olive Schreiner, A.H.M. Scholtz, Sabata-Mpho Mokae.

A notable reggae and rhythm and blues musician from Kimberley is Dr Victor.

=== Museums, monuments and memorials ===
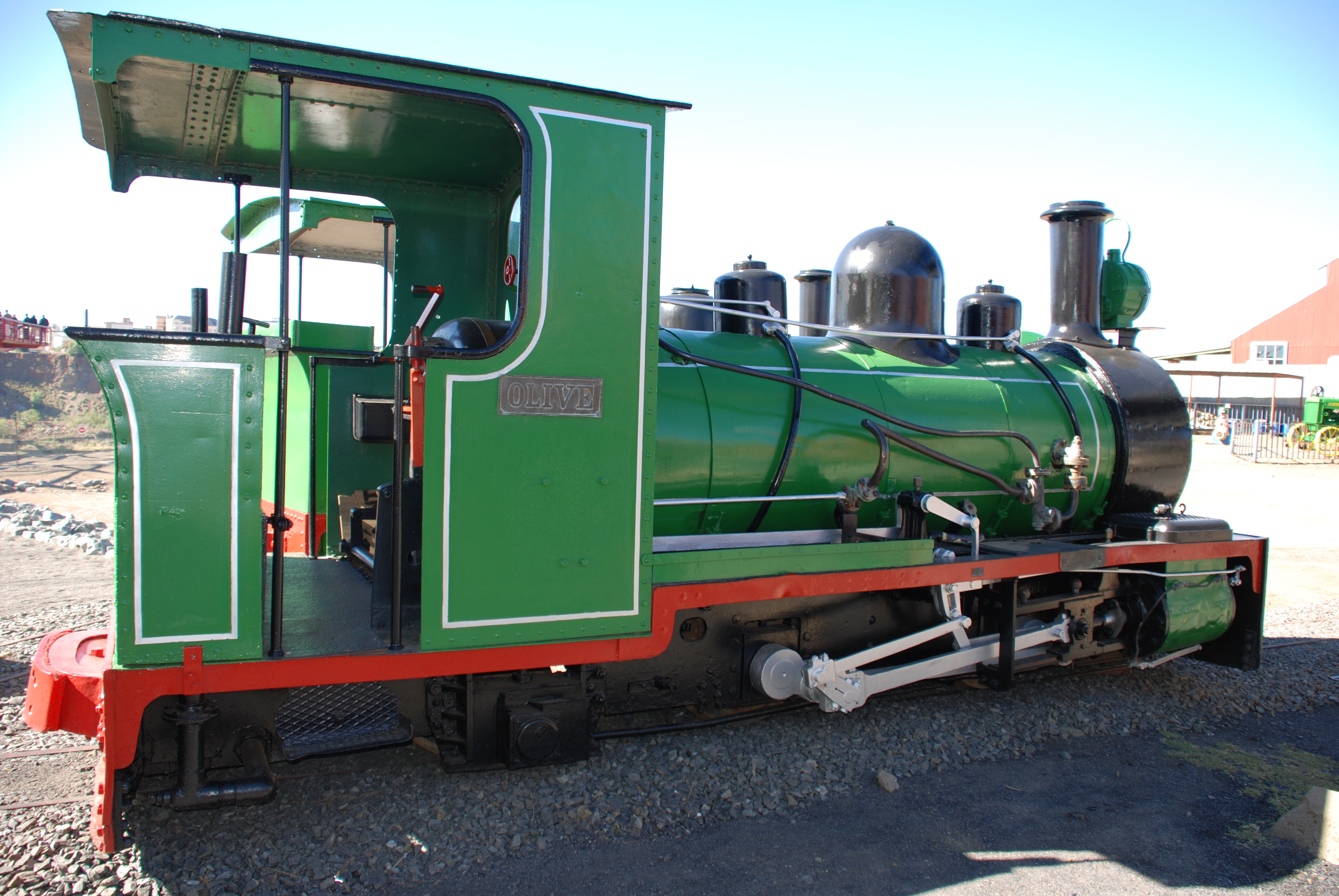
Restored locomotive at the Kimberley Mine Museum

- The Big Hole, previously known as the Kimberley Mine Museum, is a recreated townscape and museum, with Big Hole viewing platform and other features, situated next to the Kimberley Mine ("Big Hole"). It houses a rich collection of artefacts and information from the early days of the city.
- The McGregor Museum, which celebrated its centennial in 2007, curates and studies major research collections and information about the history and ecology of the Northern Cape, which are reflected in displays at the museum's headquarters at the Sanatorium in Belgravia and nine branch museums.
- The William Humphreys Art Gallery.
- The Kimberley Africana Library.
- Dunluce and Rudd House Museums.
- Pioneers of Aviation Museum: In 1913, South Africa's first flying school opened at Kimberley and started training the pilots of the South African Aviation Corps, later to become the South African Air Force. The museum is located on the site of that flying school and houses a replica of a Compton Paterson biplane, one of the first aircraft to be used for flight training. The first female on the African continent to receive her pilot's license, Ann Maria Bocciarelli, was trained at this facility.
- Robert Sobukwe's Law Office
- The Sol Plaatje Museum is located in the house where Sol Plaatje lived and wrote Mhudi.
- Transport Spoornet Museum
- Clyde N. Terry Hall of Militaria
- Freddie Tate Museum
- A heritage tramway was opened in 1985, putting one of Kimberley's historic trams back on the rails.
- On the outskirts of Kimberley, on the Barkly West Road, the Wildebeest Kuil Rock Art Centre, as well as Nooitgedacht Glacial Pavements. To the south of the city, the Magersfontein Battlefield Museum (see Battle of Magersfontein), while blockhouses can be seen at Modder River.

Memorials include:

- The Miners' Memorial, also known as the Diggers' Fountain, located in the Oppenheimer Gardens and designed by Herman Wald. It was built in honour of all the miners of Kimberley. The memorial consists of five life-sized diggers lifting a diamond sieve.
- The Honoured Dead Memorial commemorates those who died defending the city during the Siege of Kimberley in the Second Boer War.

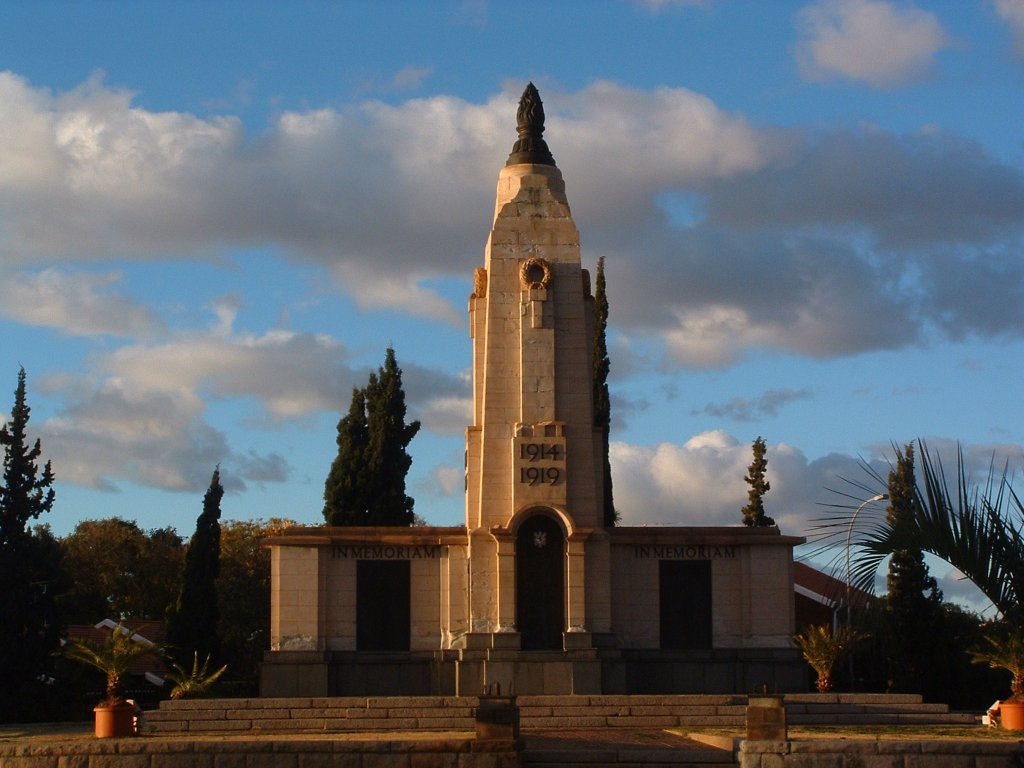
World War I memorial in Kimberley

- The Cenotaph erected originally to commemorate the fallen of World War I, with plaques added in memory of fallen Kimberley volunteers in World War II. There is a memorial dedicated to the Kimberley Cape Coloured Corps who died in the Battle of Square Hill during World War I. Consisting of a gun captured at the battle, it originally stood in Victoria Crescent, Malay Camp, but, post-1994, was moved to the Cenotaph.
- The Concentration Camp Memorial remembers those who were interned in the Kimberley concentration camp during the Second Boer War and is located in front of the Dutch Reformed Mother Church.
- The Henrietta Stockdale statue, by Jack Penn, commemorates the Anglican nun, Sister Henrietta CSM&AA (her reinterred remains are buried alongside), who petitioned the Cape Parliament to pass a law recognizing nursing as a profession and requiring compulsory state registration of nurses - a first in the world.
- The statue of Frances Baard was unveiled by Premier Hazel Jenkins on Women's Day, 9 August 2009.
- The Sol Plaatje Statue was unveiled by South African President Jacob Zuma on 9 January 2010, the 98th anniversary of the founding of the African National Congress. Sculpted by Johan Moolman, it is at the Civic Centre, formerly the Malay Camp, and situated approximately where Plaatje had his printing press in 1910–13.
- Burger Monument near Magersfontein Battlefield
- Cape Police Memorial
- Mayibuye Memorial
- Rhodes equestrian statue
- Malay Camp Memorial

=== Architecture ===
- Alexander McGregor Memorial Museum (1907)
- De Beers Head Office
- Dunluce (Late Victorian)
- Harry Oppenheimer House (mid-1970s)
- Honoured Dead Memorial
- Kimberley Africana Library
- Kimberley City Hall (Neo-classical)
- Kimberley Club
- Kimberley Regiment Drill Hall (1892)
- Kimberley Sanatorium (McGregor Museum) (1897)
- Kimberley Undenominational Schools
- Masonic Temple
- Northern Cape Provincial Legislature
- Old School of Mines (Late Victorian)
- Rudd House (The Bungalow)
- The Lodge (Duggan-Cronin Gallery)

==== Notable religious buildings ====
- Dutch Reformed Mother Church Newton is a good example of Stucco architecture in Kimberley. It was declared a National Monument in 1976, now a Provincial Heritage Site.
- Kimberley's older Mosques were replaced by newer ones as a result of the Group Areas Act and the forced resettlement of the city's Muslim communities.
- Kimberley Seventh-day Adventist Church is a small L-shaped corrugated-iron building and is considered the mother church of Seventh-day Adventists in South Africa. It was declared a National Monument in 1967, now a Provincial Heritage Site.
- St Cyprian's Anglican Cathedral was designed by Arthur Lindley of the firm of Greatbatch, the building of the nave being completed in 1908. The remainder of the cathedral was completed in stages, partly under guidance of William M. Timlin (also of the firm of Greatbatch). In 1926 the Chancel was dedicated (and as a World War I memorial); in 1936 the Lady Chapel, Vestry & new organ were added; and in 1961, the tower (a World War II memorial). The cathedral contains notable stained glass windows including works by the Pretoria artist Leo Theron.
- St Mary's Roman Catholic Cathedral.
- Synagogue in the Byzantine style designed by D.W. Greatbatch, and based on the synagogue in Florence, Italy.

=== Media ===
==== Newspapers ====
The earliest newspaper here was the Diamond Field, published initially at Pniel on 15 October 1870. Other early papers with the Diamond News and the Independent. The Diamond Fields Advertiser is Kimberley's current daily newspaper, published since 23 March 1878. The Volksblad, with a free local supplement called Noordkaap, is read by Afrikaans-speaking readers.

==== Radio ====
Two community radio stations were founded in the 1990s:

- Radio Teemaneng
- XKfm, based in the !Xun and Khwe settlement of Platfontein, outside Kimberley, and broadcasting in the two KhoeSan languages spoken at Platfontein (!Xun and Khwedam)

=== Sport ===
==== Cricket ====
Kimberley has supplied several international cricketers, such as Frank (Nipper) Nicholson, Xenophon Balaskas (born in Kimberley to Greek parents), Ken Viljoen, Ronnie Draper, and in more recent times Pat Symcox and the Proteas coach Mickey Arthur.

Kimberley hosted a match from the 2003 ICC Cricket World Cup.

==== Rugby ====
Frank Dobbin known as Uncle Dobbin was a member of Paul Roos' original Springboks in the tour to the British Isles in 1906/1907. His memory lives in his old colonial-style home in Roper street, bearing a simple brass plaque with the name 'Dobbin'. Later Springboks to wear green and gold included Ian Kirkpatrick, Tommy Bedford and Gawie Visagie, brother of Ammosal-based Springbok flyhalf Piet Visagie.

Kimberley is home to the Griquas rugby team, which has won the Currie Cup four times in 1899, 1911, 1970, and 2025. Ronnie Bauser an ex-mayor of Kimberley were involved in Griquas rugby for 1950–1971.

==== Football ====
Richard Henyekane, South African footballer, is from Kimberley, his younger brother Joseph played for Golden Arrows. Jimmy Tau is from Kimberley.

==== Swimming ====
Karen Muir, born in Kimberley, became in 1965 the youngest person to break a world record in any sport. This age group record stands to this day. She set it in August 1965 at the junior world champions in Blackpool, England, in the 110 metres (360 ft) backstroke at the age of 12. She went on to break many more world records but was denied a role in world swimming when she lost the opportunity to represent her country at the 1968 Olympic games in Mexico City as a result of South Africa being excluded for its racial apartheid policies. Kimberley also saw a world record broken in the municipal pool that now bears Muir's name. It was Johannesburg's Anne Fairlie who beat Karen Muir and Frances Kikki Caron in a time breaking the world record.

Charl Bouwer, the Paralympic swimmer from South Africa who won gold in the 50m freestyle at the 2012 Summer Paralympics in London, was born in Kimberley.

==== Athletics ====
Bevil Rudd, Olympic medallist.

==== Lawn bowls ====
Elsie McDonald was a Springbok bowler.

==== Skateboarding ====
The first Maloof Money Cup World Skateboarding Championships were held in Kimberley in September 2011 and again in 2012. When the Maloof family sponsorship ended in 2013 the event became known as the Kimberley Diamond Cup.

==== Sporting facilities ====
- Griqua Park
- De Beers Diamond Oval
- Galeshewe Stadium

=== Quotations ===
"Kimberley has had a profound effect on the course of history in Southern Africa. The discovery of diamonds there, more than a century ago, proved to be the first step in the transformation of South Africa from an agricultural into an industrial country. When gold and other minerals were later discovered to the north, there were already Kimberley men of vision and enterprise with the capital and technology to develop the new resources". - H.F. Oppenheimer, 1976. Foreword to Brian Roberts's book, Kimberley, Turbulent City.

Anthony Trollope visited Kimberley in 1877 and was notoriously put off by the heat, enervating and hideous, and the dust and the flies of the early mining town almost drove him mad: "I sometimes thought that the people of Kimberley were proud of their flies and their dust". Of the townscape, largely built of sun-dried brick, and of plank and canvas and corrugated iron sheets brought up by ox-wagon from the coast, he remarked: "In Kimberley there are two buildings with a storey above the ground, and one of these is in the square: this is its only magnificence. There is no pavement. The roadway is all dust and holes. There is a market place in the midst which certainly is not magnificent. Around are the corrugated iron shops of the ordinary dealers in provisions. An uglier place I do not know how to imagine".

A.H.J. Bourne, a former headmaster of Kimberley Boys' High School, returned to the city in 1937, observing that: "The history of Kimberley would appear remarkable to any stranger who could not fail to think that some supermind was behind its destinies. In so short a time it has grown from bare veld".

In the early 1990s, the writer Dan Jacobson returned to Kimberley, where he had grown up in the 1930s, giving a sense of how things had changed: "The people I had known had vanished; so had their language. That contributed to my ghostlike state. In my earliest years the whites of Kimberley spoke English only; Afrikaans was the tongue of the Cape Coloured people.... Now I was addressed in Afrikaans everywhere I went, by white, black, and Coloured alike".

"Kimberley dull?" asked the Virtualtourist reviewer Catherine Reichardt. "Happily, the answer is a resounding 'No', provided that you have a passion for history - in which case Kimberley has it in spades, and you'll probably need to overnight to fully appreciate its attractions and charms. In many ways, exploring Kimberley and its heritage is like experiencing South African history in microcosm".

== See also ==
- Apostolic Vicariate of Kimberley in Orange for the region's Catholic missionary history
- List of heritage sites in Kimberley
- Mokala National Park
- People of Kimberley
- Trams in Kimberley, Northern Cape
