= Cape Police Memorial =

South African national heritage site

The Cape Police Memorial is a South African national heritage site located in Kimberley in the Northern Cape province. It commemorates the losses of the unit during the Anglo-Boer War.

In 1994, it was described in the Government Gazette as

Memorial comprising statue of a policeman on an elaborate plinth with Ionic columns and two crouching lions at the base.

It features a Boer gun captured during a skirmish in the war.

== See also ==
- Siege of Kimberley
