= Kimberley Seventh-day Adventist Church =

Heritage site in Kimberley, South Africa

The Kimberley Seventh-day Adventist Church is a provincial heritage site in Kimberley in the Northern Cape province of South Africa. It is part of the worldwide Seventh-day Adventist Church.

In 1967 it was described in the Government Gazette as

Small corrugated iron L-shaped church with gothic windows and entrance portico. This church is the original church in the Republic of South Africa of the Seventh Day Adventist Church.
