= Vryburg High School =

School in Vryburg, North West Province, South Africa

- Afrikaans: Hoërskool Vryburg

Location
- De Kock Street; Vryburg, North West, 8601; South Africa; 26.95304°S 24.72826°E

Information
- Type: Public secondary school Day and boarding school
- Motto: Latin: Carpe Diem (Grab the opportunity)
- Established: 1891
- School board: North West Department of Education
- School district: Dr RS Mompati District
- Principal: Mr Barry Fuleni
- Grades: 8 – 12
- Gender: Co-educational
- Enrollment: 737 (in 2020)
- Language: Afrikaans & English
- Campus type: Suburban
- Colours: Green; White; Gold
- Website: http://vryburg.net

Vryburg High School (VHS) is a co-educational public secondary school for day and boarding pupils located in Vryburg, North West, South Africa. The school made news in 1998 when tensions between white, Afrikaans-speaking students and black students who were taught in English led to violence including alleged hostage-taking, beatings of students, and riots. However, today Vryburg High School maintains a safe environment and performs exceptionally well in areas such as sports, culture, and produces some of the best academic results in the North West province.

== Academics ==
Learners write the National Senior Certificate (NSC) examinations.

Pass rate from 2010 to 2019
Year	Percentage (%)
2019	97
2018	95
2017	97
2016	100
2015	99
2014	100
2013	99
2012	97
2011	98
2010	99

== History ==
The Stellaland Republic was founded in 1882. At that stage there was no formal education on a large scale mainly due to the small number of inhabitants and a lack of funds but on the other hand also because the basic skills (reading and writing) could be learned at home.

In 1883, however, two private schools were founded by miss Dedman and miss Kennedy. The Vryburg community and the imperial government (British Bechuanaland) merged and eventually, on 2 February 1891, the Vryburg Public School came into being with an enrollment of 20 students. Mr Kelly was initially appointed as acting principal, but was permanently appointed in 1893. By 1901, enrollment had increased to 200 students.

However, there was another school that was established in 1883, the so-called Poor School, which was established by the local Dutch Reformed Church for needy children. The Vryburg Public School came under the authority of the Cape Colony in 1895 when the British Bechuanaland was incorporated into the Cape Colony. The Poor School was then incorporated into the Public School.

After the War of Independence, there were two more schools in the Vryburg area; the monastery school as well as a school in the concentration camp. The local NG minister also founded the "Independent School" because there were many different language groups. So there were then five different schools in Vryburg. All the schools merged in 1909 to form one school.

In 1913, H. Rosenblatt laid the cornerstone of the new school. However, the new school was initially quite small and in 1925 the Education Department budgeted to rebuild new school buildings. The former Minister of Education, Dr DF Malan, laid the cornerstone of the current school building in 1928. The architect was William M. Timlin.

Stellaland Primary School (now Vryburg Primary School) was formed in 1940 through the separation of the primary school from the high school due to an overwhelming number of pupils which was then 717.

During 1948 the school was enlarged by the addition of a new science laboratory, a library and a classroom; at the same time, the woodworking and household classrooms were equipped. The number pupils exceeded the 600 notch in 1960 and the school was further enlarged.

In 1980 the building plans for further extensions were approved and in 1987 the new building complex was officially received by the Department and opened by S. W. Walters, Director of Education. The expansion included a fully equipped technical section with 3 workshops for automotive, electrician and fitting and turning, 17 classrooms, 3 laboratories, 1 household classroom, 6 administrative offices, an enlarged hall, a medical inspection unit, several packing rooms and bathrooms.

== Sports ==
The school has a strong sporting reputation and access to the Gert Lubbe sports grounds. The grounds include rugby, hockey, and soccer pitches, as well as netball and tennis courts.

== Boarding houses ==
On 7 September 1967, Dr Nico Malan, then the administrator of the province, opened the current residence buildings.

The two current residence buildings were not easy to obtain. The matter was even quoted in the Provincial Council where it was granted after a number of representations.

J.P. (Hannes) du Toit, former provincial councillor, worked particularly hard for the acquisition of the two residences during his term. The girl's residence was therefore named after him: Hannes du Toit House.

Dr Nico Malan was the former administrator of the Cape Province who gave the final approval for the buildings. The boy's residence, House Nico Malan House, was named after him.

== Notable alumni ==
- Albert van den Berg - Springboks rugby union player
