= Trams in Kimberley, Northern Cape =

Former public transport system in Kimberley, South Africa

Coordinates: 28°44′40″S 24°46′18″E

Kimberley tramway network
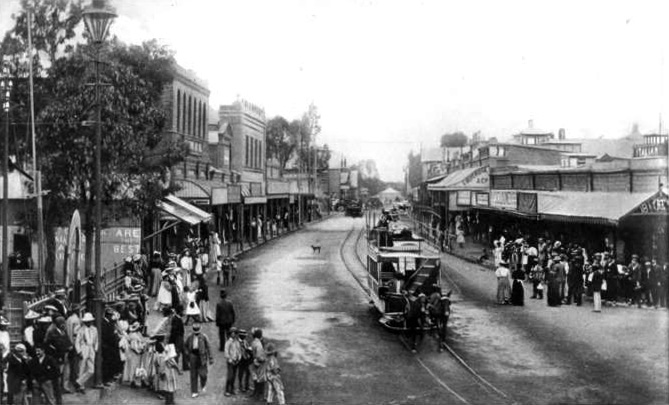
- A double-deck horsecar (hauled by mules), Du Toitspan Road, Kimberley, ca. 1900.

Operation
- Locale: Kimberley, Northern Cape, South Africa

Statistics
Horsecar era: 1887–1914
- Status: Closed
- Track gauge: 1,067 mm (3 ft 6 in)
- Propulsion systems: Horses, Mules
Steam tram era: 1900–1906
- Status: Closed
- Track gauge: 1,067 mm (3 ft 6 in)
- Propulsion system: Steam
Electric tram era: 1905–1947
- Status: Closed
- Track gauge: 1,067 mm (3 ft 6 in)
- Electrification: 500 V DC, overhead trolley wire
Heritage tram era: since 1985
- Status: Open (as of 2012)
- Track gauge: 1,067 mm (3 ft 6 in)
- Electrification: 500 V DC, overhead trolley wire

A steam tram at the open air museum in Kimberley

The Kimberley tramway network formed part of the public transport system in Kimberley, Northern Cape, South Africa, for roughly 60 years until the late 1940s. Operation started with horse-drawn trams, on 21 June 1887. Mules replaced the horses in the early 1890s. For a few years starting in 1900 tram sets hauled by steam tram engines were also operated on some lines. The first day of public service for electric trams was 25 April 1905. The first electric trams were four single-deck cars purchased from the John Stephenson Car Company, of New York. More trams were purchased later from the J. G. Brill Company and the United Electric Car Company.

Lines were gradually electrified, but not until 1914 were the last mule trams taken out of use, upon conversion of the Kennilworth route to electric trams. The last day of service was 30 November 1947, with the closure of the Kennilworth route.

== Heritage tramway ==
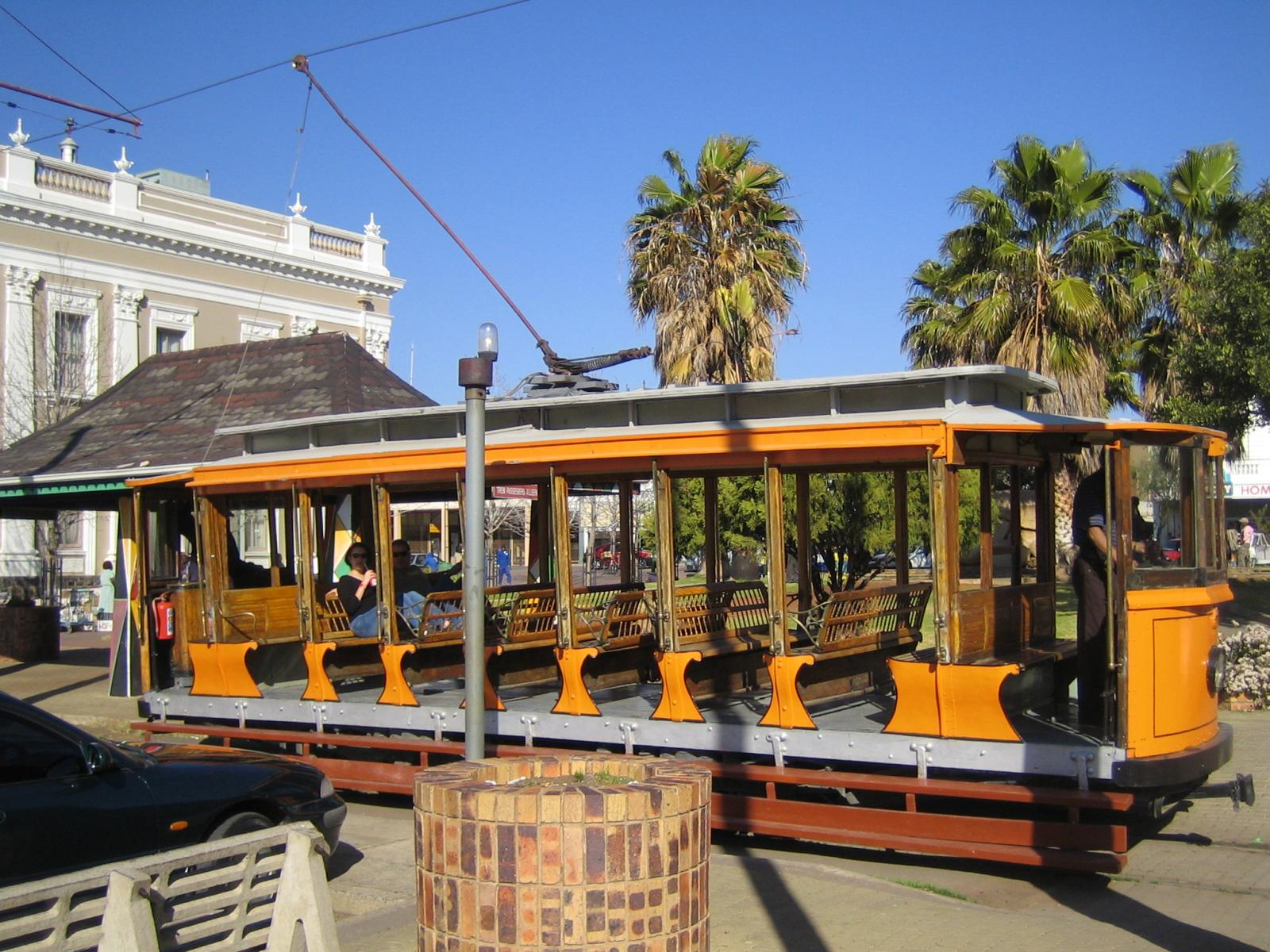
The tram at Market Square in 2007

A heritage tram line opened in 1985, on a 1.4-kilometre (0.87 mi) line connecting City Hall with the Open Mine Museum, located on the De Beers Consolidated Mining Company premises, passing the "Big Hole" (Kimberley Mine) along the way. It was designed as an attraction for museum visitors. Service began in October 1985, using a single tram: Open-sided, four-wheel car number 1, built in 1905 for the Kimberley & Alexandersfontein Electric Railway by the John Stephenson Company. It had been converted into "tower car" (overhead wire maintenance car) No. 4 in the mid-1920s, and was reconverted into a passenger car in 1983–1985, for use on the heritage tramway. The line is entirely single-track and includes street running along Church Street and roadside running along the old Pniel Road and North Circular Road.

Service on the line was suspended from 2005 until November 2006, during renovation of the museum. Service was suspended again in 2008, when erosion of the sides of the Big Hole led city officials to close Pniel Road to all traffic, for safety reasons. There was also a need to upgrade the braking systems on the tram, along with other issues. There was a possibility that the line might never reopen, but service resumed in June 2010. A tram enthusiast visitor from Australia was advised in January 2024 that the tram had not operated "for some time" and was unlikely to resume due to the shortage of expertise and spare parts. The tram was stored in the open at the "Big Hole" terminus. The track and overhead appeared largely intact.

== See also ==
- History of Kimberley, Northern Cape
- List of town tramway systems in Africa
- Rail transport in South Africa
- Transport in Kimberley, Northern Cape
