= Radio Teemaneng Stereo 89.1 FM =

Teemaneng FM

South Africa
- Broadcast area: Northern Cape
- Frequency: 89.1 MHz

Radio Teemaneng Stereo 89.1 FM is a South African community radio station based in the Northern Cape.

== Coverage Areas & Frequencies ==
- Kimberley
- Warrenton
- Kuruman
- The borders of the Free State

== Broadcast Languages ==
- English
- Afrikaans
- Xhosa
- Tswana

== Broadcast Time ==
- 24/7

== Target Audience ==
- LSM Groups 1 – 8
- Age Group 16 – 49
- The Black Community

== Programme Format ==
- 65% Music
- 35% Talk

== Listenership Figures ==
Estimated Listenership
	7 Day
May 2013	106 000
Feb 2013	135 000
Dec 2012	134 000
Oct 2012	134 000
Aug 2012	123 000
Jun 2012	121 000
