= William M. Timlin =

South African architect (1902–1966)

William Timlin
- Born: 11 April 1892; Ashington, Northumberland, England
- Died: 7 June 1943 (aged 51); Kimberley, Northern Cape, South Africa
- Citizenship: British
- Education: Armstrong College of Art
- Occupations: Architect; Artist
- Years active: 1913-1943
- Spouse: Marjorie Salonika
- Children: 1
- Practice: Greatbatch & Timlin

"The Finished Palace of the Princess" from The Ship that Sailed to Mars, 1923

William Mitcheson Timlin (11 April 1892 – 7 June 1943) was a British architect and artist.

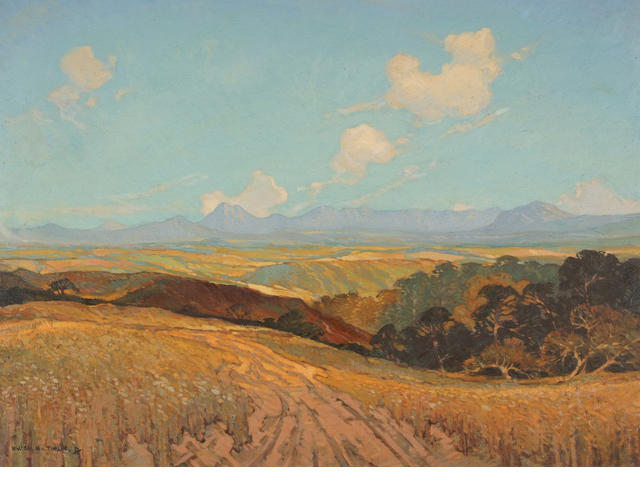
"Western Cape Landscape", W.M. Timlin

== Biography ==
William Mitcheson Timlin was born in Ashington, Northumberland, the son of Peter Timlin, a colliery fireman, and his wife Margaret Mitcheson. His talent for drawing at Morpeth Grammar School earned him a scholarship to the Armstrong College of Art in Newcastle. In 1912, he accompanied his parents to Kimberley, South Africa where he was apprenticed to the British architect D.W. Greatbatch. In 1914, he passed the South Kensington Board of Education Art examinations with Honours and, that year, founded the Art section of the Kimberley Athenaeum Club, and was the club's chairman until it disbanded in the 1940s.

In 1920, Timlin joined Greatbatch as a partner in the firm Greatbatch & Timlin; the following year, Greatbatch left South Africa and Timlin continued the practice without changing the firm's name. The firm completed a large number of buildings in Kimberley, but Timlin's skill as an artist are most evident in the interiors of two theatres: the Colosseum in Johannesburg and the Alhambra Theatre in Cape Town.

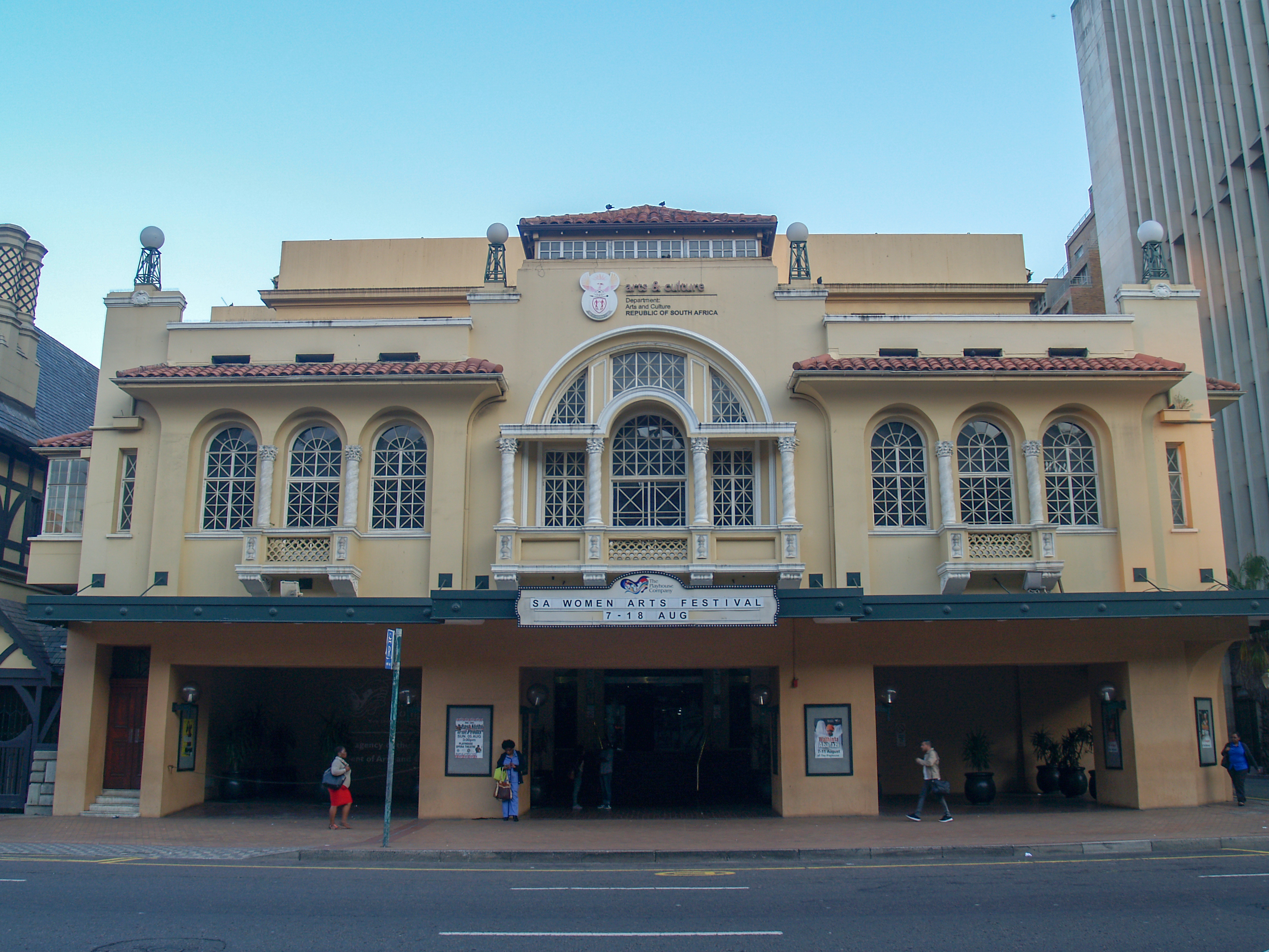
The Playhouse Theatre, Durban

Timlin was a successful artist. He worked in watercolours and pastels, and held several exhibitions, including the annual exhibition of the Suid-Afrikaanse Akademie vir Wetenskap en Kuns, from 1919 until his death. Some of his paintings are now in the William Humphreys Art Gallery, which took over from the Athenaeum Club. Timlin also worked as an etcher, and book and magazine illustrator; he illustrated the Hedley Chilvers book Out of the Crucible. He designed the first cover of The Outspan and did many illustrations for that magazine. His work can also be found in many South African travel books from that era. In March 1934, he designed the illuminated address presented by the Municipality of Kimberley to HRH Prince George on his visit there. Timlin also wrote music and had a significant toy collection.

Timlin wrote and illustrated the 1923 book The Ship that sailed to Mars, about an old man who dreams of sailing to Mars “by way of the Moon and the more friendly planets.” He designs and builds a ship with the help of elves and fairies, and journeys to “the tiny Orb that was the Wonder World of Mars”, encountering all manner of creatures and adventures along the way. Originally conceived as a work to entertain his young son, the book carries 48 watercolour plates, alternating with forty-eight pages of Timlin’s own handsome calligraphic text. When Timlin sent the book to the London publisher George G. Harrap and Co., Harrap was sufficiently impressed that he printed the book as it was, without typesetting. Two thousand copies were printed. The Dictionary of Twentieth Century British Book Illustrators describes it as a masterpiece and “the most original and beautiful children’s book of the 1920s”. The film rights were purchased by an American producer, who was going to call it "Get Off the Earth", but the film was not made.

Timlin illustrated another book, The Building of a Fairy City, but it was not published; he died of pneumonia, at age 51, before it was completed. His original drawings are now highly valued.

Timlin outlived his wife, Marjorie Salonika (1893-1937), who died in a car crash; they were survived by one son, William, born in 1929. He is also remembered at Johannesburg's Kingsmead College, where a house is named after him.

== Known Works ==
- Kimberley Girls' High School, 1913 (as apprentice), Gate
- Kimberley Boys' High School, 1914 (as apprentice)
- Kimberley Hospital, 1915 (as apprentice), Memorial Window
- Tucker's Hotel, Heilbron, c 1925
- Plaza Kinema, Kimberley, 1928 (interior)
- Great War Memorial - The Cenotaph, Kimberley, 1928
- Vryburg High School, Vryburg, 1928
- The Consolidated Building, Diamond Corporation Ltd., Kimberley, 1928 (attrib.)
- Anglican Church, Sydney on Vaal, 1930
- Memorial to Colonel Sir David Harris, Kimberley, 1930
- The Playhouse, Durban
- The Alhambra Theatre, Capetown, 1931 (interior)
- Kimberley Golf Club, Clubhouse Editions, 1932
- The Colosseum, Johannesburg, 1933 (interior)
- Old Boys' War Memorial at St. Patrick's Christian Brothers' College, Kimberley, 1933
- Memorial to Major General Sir Henry Lukin, Kimberley, 1934
- Queen's Hotel, Bloemfontein, 1938
