= Benjamin Bennet =

Benjamin Bennet may refer to:

- Benjamin Bennet (politician) (1764–1840), American politician
- Benjamin Bennet (minister) (c. 1674–1726), English Presbyterian minister

== See also ==
- Benjamin Bennett (disambiguation)
