= Apostolic Vicariate of Kimberley in Orange =

The portion of South Africa which would form the Vicariate of Kimberley in Orange (Latin: Vicariatus Apostolicus Fluminis Orangensis) had earlier become in the division of the Apostolic Vicariate of Good Hope part of the Eastern District, and later on part of the Apostolic Vicariate of Natal. The Vicarate was promoted to the Roman Catholic Diocese of Kimberley in 1951.

== History ==
In 1886 it became a separate vicariate comprising Basutoland, Griqualand West, Bechuanaland and the Orange River Colony (then still Orange Free State). On 8 May 1894, Basutoland was separated and made an independent prefecture. Since then, the vicariate included the Orange River Colony, Griqualand-West and Bechuanaland, and after the later Anglo-Boer War, all this territory came under British colonial rule. The whole vicariate lays between the Tropic of Capricorn and the southernmost point of the Orange River Colony, and between 22° and 30° East Longitude.

Before the discovery of diamonds, the white population was practically composed of Protestant Boers. The number of Catholics was insignificant. The towns now in existence were then mere small villages or did not yet exist. However, in 1870 Kimberley began to attract attention; diamonds had been first discovered about three years previously by John O'Reilly, and immigration brought to South Africa and especially to Kimberley multitudes of Europeans, most of them Irish and English.

By the time Kimberley was leaping into existence there was already a priest in Bloemfontein, Peter Hoendervangers of the Order of Saint Norbert, who had followed the troops as military chaplain during a war between the British and Boers in 1854. He built a church which was replaced by a new one in 1880. When Hoendervangers left Bloemfontein, he was replaced by Victor Bompart, sent by Charles-Constant Jolivet to minister to the scanty Catholic population. For some time, the number of Catholics remained limited to eight or ten. All of them were too poor to support the priest, who very often saw himself on the verge of starvation. However, Bompart never swerved from his duty; he was always ready to face sacrifice. His greatest trial was neither starvation nor physical sufferings, but the fruitlessness of the soil he had to cultivate. Being obliged to live in the midst of an element prejudiced against anything which might remind them of Rome and hating the very name of Catholic, his labours were to remain apparently fruitless for several years. The Boers were unwilling to hear of another creed than their own. Their ministers never wearied of railing at and abusing pope and priests. Owing to such a spirit conversions have been always few; many prejudices, however, have been overcome by schools conducted by nuns of various orders.

When Kimberley started into existence, the number of Catholics in the locality necessitated the frequent visit of the priest and very soon the establishment of a permanent mission. Bompart, François Lebihan, and Anatole Hidien used to visit them occasionally. Hidien finally established a Catholic Society and began the erection of a hospital. A poor and small chapel was first erected, but owing to the increase of the Catholic congregation, a larger and more substantial one was planned and built. Its erection is due to the indefatigable Hilary Lenoir, Missionary Oblates of Mary Immaculate (O.M.I.). The whole vicariate is greatly indebted to him for all the missions he has founded or helped to found; Kimberley, Mafeking and Harrismith have, thanks to him, their churches and presbyteries.

When in 1886 a separate vicariate was erected, Anthony Gaughren, also O.M.I., was appointed the first Vicar Apostolic; he was elected in May, 1886, consecrated on 10 August 1886, and died in Kimberley on 15 January 1901. On 29 January 1902, his brother, Matthew Gaughren, O.M.I., was elected to replace him, and was consecrated titular bishop of Tentyra on 16 March 1902. Under the jurisdiction of these two bishops the Vicariate of Kimberley has seen its churches and schools multiplied.

In 1910, the vicariate had 16 churches and chapels; 19 priests (of whom 16 belong to the Missionary Oblates of Mary Immaculate); one college under the management of the Congregation of Christian Brothers, where over 300 boys received a thorough education. The Sisters of the Holy Family conducted 6 parochial schools and 3 boarding schools. The Sisters of Mercy had two schools, a boarding school in Mafikeng and a parochial school in Vryburg, North West. The Sisters of St. Jacut conducted at Taungs a school for natives. Taungs, the only native mission then, was founded in May, 1898, by Frédéric Porte, O.M.I., and counted over 400 Catholics. The total number of children frequenting Catholic schools was over 1200. Besides the schools, the Vicariate of Kimberley had an establishment for orphans, the poor and the aged, managed by the Sisters of Nazareth. The devoted self-sacrifice of these Sisters contributed to overcome the prejudices of Protestants who help them generously in the upkeep of their establishment, where over one hundred and fifty children and aged persons were cared for; all the primary schools were in part supported by the Government. Besides the 16 Oblates and the 3 secular priests, 3 lay brothers, 11 Christian Brothers (Irish), 42 Sisters of the Holy Family of Bordeaux, 14 Sisters of Nazareth, 5 Sisters of Saint Jacut and 12 Sisters of Mercy carried out the work of regeneration in the vicariate.

One of the great obstacles to evangelisation in this vicariate was the fact of the population being scattered and unsettled, preventing the priest from being in continual touch with his flock. The small number of priests permitted no increase of mission work amongst the natives, who far outnumbered the white population. The mining industry seemed the only source of material wealth, and its exploitation was to end. In the farming districts, though communication was facilitated by the construction of railways, the future seemed precarious owing to droughts, cattle diseases, locusts etc. As a consequence the population is unsettled and shifting, and sacerdotal vocations within the vicariate are hardly to be expected for the present. Catechisms and prayer books in the native language have, however, been compiled by Porte who made an expedition into Bechuanaland in 1898.
