= Dorian Haarhoff =

South African-Namibian writer and poet (born 1944)

Dorian Haarhoff (born 1944) is a South African-Namibian writer and poet. Haarhoff was born in Kimberley, Northern Cape, then part of the Cape Province. He is a naturalized citizen of Namibia. He wrote his first poem in 1955 and has been published in numerous books. He was also a professor of English at the University of Namibia. As of 2004, he worked in the creative writing department at the University of Cape Town.

== Publications ==
- "Two Cheers for Socialism: Nadine Gordimer and E. M. Forster," English in Africa, 9:1(1982), 55–64.
- "Emeralds, Ex-Gentlemen, ESCOM and ISCOR: Frontier Literature in Namibia Circa 1925," English Studies in Africa (Johannesburg) 31, no. 1 (1988): 1–18. https://doi.org/10.1080/00138398808690844.
- "A Soldier in Namibia: Gustav Frenssen’s Peter Moor’s Journey to Southwest Africa," Logos, Vol. 8:2(1988), 81–83.
- "Bondels and Bombs: The Bondelwarts Rebellion in Historical Fiction," English Studies in Africa (Johannesburg) 32:1(1989), 25–39. https://doi.org/10.1080/00138398908690857.
- "Literary Ivory: The Nineteenth-Century Travelogue in Namibia and Victorian Priorities," English Academy Review 6:1(1989), 42–60. https://doi.org/10.1080/10131758985310071.
- The Wild South-West: Frontier Myths and Metaphors in Literature Set in Namibia, 1760-1988 (Witwatersrand University Press, 1991), 262 pages.
- Desert December Illustrated by Leon Vermeulen. (Clarion Books, 1992).
- Aquifers and Dust (Justified Press, 1994). (54 pages)
- The Inner Eye: Namibian Poetry in Process (Basler Afrika Bibliographien, 1997). (editor)
- Goats, Oranges & Skeletons: A Trilogy of Namibian Independence Plays (Windhoek: New Namibia Books, 2000), 181 pages. Edited by Terence Zeeman.
- Review of: "Sounding the Depths of Leadership: Seven Character Development Voyages To Foster Authentic Leadership in the Ongoing Present," Leadership (London, England) 19:2(2023), 186–90. https://doi.org/10.1177/17427150221148845
