= Richard Henyekane =

South African soccer player (1983-2015)

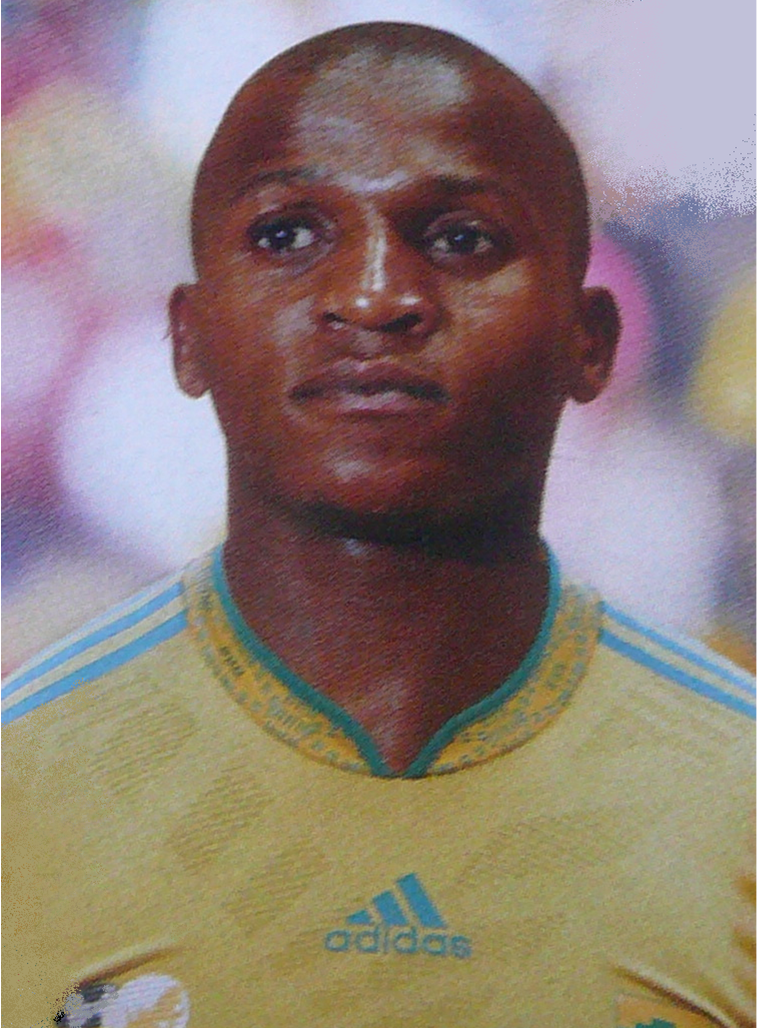
- Henyekane with South Africa in 2010

Personal information
- Full name: Richard Tebogo Henyekane
- Date of birth: 28 September 1983
- Place of birth: Kimberley, South Africa
- Date of death: 7 April 2015 (aged 31)
- Place of death: Bethlehem, South Africa
- Height: 1.70 m (5 ft 7 in)
- Positions: Striker; winger

Youth career
- Naughty Boys
- 1999–2001: Basotho Tigers

Senior career*
| Years | Team | Apps | (Gls) |
| 2002–2002 | Basotho Tigers | | |
| 2003–2004 | Hellenic | 4 | (0) |
| 2004–2010 | Golden Arrows | 119 | (35) |
| 2010–2015 | Mamelodi Sundowns | 44 | (5) |
| 2014 | → Free State Stars (loan) | 32 | (7) |
| Total | | 199 | (47) |

International career
| 2009–2013 | South Africa | 9 | (0) |
- * Club domestic league appearances and goals

Richard Henyekane (28 September 1983 – 7 April 2015) was a South African professional soccer player who also represented the national team.

== Early and personal life ==
Henyekane hails from Kimberley's Galeshewe township; his younger brother Joseph, who died in December 2014 in a car accident, was also a professional footballer.

== Career ==
Henyekane made his professional debut for Premier United-Hellenic against Jomo Cosmos on 8 February 2004. He joined Golden Arrows in the 2004/05 season, with his first goal coming in Arrows' 1–1 draw against Manning Rangers on 19 January 2005. Henyekane, who played as a striker or attacking right wing position, had his career best season with Golden Arrows in the PSL. The striker bagged three hat-tricks during the 2009–2010 PSL season ending with 19 league goals, as well as a further Telkom Knockout hat-trick, finishing with 23 goals for the season. The striker was then snapped up by Mamelodi Sundowns on a lucrative three-year contract as a free agent. On 4 March 2012, his team set a record in the Nedbank Cup when they beat Powerlines FC by 24–0, with Henyekane scoring five of the goals. He joined Free State Stars on loan from Sundowns in the January Transfer Window of 2014, with the move made permanent in July 2014. During this time, he made 18 league appearances and scored seven goals in the process. Henyekane had made 17 appearances in the 2014–2015 season; his last match was as a substitute appearance against AmaZulu at the Moses Mabhida Stadium in Durban on 4 April 2015, and his last goal came in Stars' 1–1 draw with Orlando Pirates at Charles Mopeli stadium on 6 May 2014.

== International career ==
Henyekane was first called up for international duty in 2009 but was left out of the Joel Santana squad for the 2009 Fifa Confederations Cup. He later made his international debut in a 3–1 loss against Serbia on 12 August 2009. Henyekane made nine official appearances for the South Africa national team.

He died in a car accident on 7 April 2015.
