= Andrew Henry Martin Scholtz =

South African writer (1923–2004)

Andrew Henry Martin Scholtz (28 July 1923, Kimberley – 17 November 2004, Mafikeng) was a South African writer.

== Biography ==
=== Early life and education ===
Andrew Henry Martin Scholtz was born on 28 July 1923 in Kimberley, South Africa. Scholtz was the eldest of ten children. His mother was a "house mother", as he would put it and his father a saddler. Scholtz passed standard 5 (Grade 7) at Beaconsfield Coloured School in Kimberley. However, he had to leave school and work as a carpenter with his uncle in order support his family after his father broke his hip and became bedridden. His mother got him the job.

=== Career ===
Poverty compelled him to join the army in October 1940. He had to present himself as being 21 although he was only 17. It was a requirement for joining the Cape Corps that he have a driver's license. He however did not have one thus joining the artillery entity instead. Here he was accepted as a white and conceded to this, as he puts it, "to feed his family not to be accepted as a white man". This experience had a lasting impact on him: being a soldier in a whites only battalion, he carried this secret for five years. Then he returned after having served in Kenya, Ethiopia and Egypt, alas, too late for his father had passed on. He had spent twenty months in the north of Italy as a prisoner of war before he escaped.

12 June 1948 he married Gazina Ortell from Siena, who became the mother of his twelve children, in a court in Kimberley. He worked for a while in Swaziland and Botswana, using the trade taught to him earlier in his life and settled as a building contractor in Mafikeng, South Africa (then Bophuthatswana). As a result of the Apartheid legislation he could never realise his lifelong ideal of owning a cattle farm although he could afford to acquire a farm in cash.

In 1995 Andrew Henry Martin Scholtz debuted, at the age of 75, with his novel Vatmaar. Although the novel has an Afrikaans mindset he wrote it initially in English, in neat, fully handwritten hardcover books before his daughter Elizabeth translated it. He worked on the story for a period of three years before sending it to David Phillip Publishers in Cape Town, who then forwarded it to Kwela Books (Afrikaans Publishing Company) as the story did not translate so well. Kwela Books was a newly established company with the goal of finding new talent. Annarie van der Merwe of Kwela Books decided that it was an Afrikaans story so it should be published in Afrikaans.

Scholtz wrote two more books while waiting for the publication of Vatmaar, which were published later: Langsaan die vuur: vyf lewensverhale (1996) and Afdraai: 'n kroniek van seermaak en seerkry(1998).

=== Death and afterward ===
On 17 November 2004 Andrew Henry Martin Scholtz died from acute asthma after spending the last two months being blind as well. He is remembered for Vatmaar.

== Published works ==
- Vatmaar (1995)
- Langsaan die vuur (1996)
- Afdraai (1998)

== Awards ==
- 2002: Patrick Petersen Memorial Prize, Afrikaans Writers Society
