= Alhambra Theatre (Cape Town) =

Former theatre and cinema in Cape Town, South Africa

Coordinates: 33.919°S 18.422°E

The Alhambra Bioscope, also known as the Alhambra Theatre, was a theatre that opened on Riebeek Street, Cape Town, South Africa in 1929.

== History ==
The Alhambra was built in 1928 for Harry Stodel's African Consolidated Theatres. It was called South Africa's best "atmospheric theatre." It had a Wurlitzer theatre organ that could produce many sound effects. It opened in 1929.

Plays and musicals were also presented for four decades in the theatre. Among the entertainers to perform here were Marlene Dietrich, Nellie du Toit, Angelo Gobbato, and Phyllis Spira.

The only Afrikaans language theater company to perform here, according to André Huguenet, was his company with its production of Is Jy ’n Bokryer? in the 1940s. It was also sometimes used by KRUIK (the Cape Performing Arts Council).

The building closed in January 1972 and was sold in 1974 and demolished the same year.
