= Khoisan X =

South African political activist

Khoisan X (4 March 1955 – 13 October 2010), formerly Benny Alexander, was a South African political activist born in Kimberley, South Africa.

== Early life ==
Bennett Alexander was the third child of Estelle and Johann Alexander, a labourer in Kimberley, the city where he grew up. He matriculated from the William Pescod High School, Kimberley, in 1975. Following initial employment with the South African government Department of Manpower, until 1981, Alexander served for a year on a Christian youth team which travelled around Zimbabwe and South Africa, before he moved to Johannesburg where he worked as a sale representative for a pharmaceutical company.

== Labour activist ==
At this time Alexander helped to form the Black Health and Allied Workers Union of South Africa, serving as a senior shop steward and vice-chairperson of the local shop stewards' committee. He also chaired the union's national advisory committee. From 1986 he took up full-time employment with the South African Black Municipal and Allied Workers Union, an affiliate of the National Council of Trade Unions (Nactu).

== Political career ==
In 1989 Alexander became personal aide to Zephania Mothopeng, President of the Pan-Africanist Congress, following his release from Robben Island. He accompanied Mothopeng to the United States and the United Kingdom, April to August 1989, taking in Kenya and Zimbabwe (where the Organisation of African Unity was meeting). On his return later that year Alexander was a founding member and elected as first General Secretary of the Pan-Africanist Movement, a legal front for the PAC. He was elected to the same position at the PAC's first congress after its unbanning in 1990.

Alexander used Zeph Mothopeng's memorial service in 1990 to urge PAC supporters to intensify the armed struggle against the Nationalist Government, who had agreed to an initial sit down with the relevant stakeholders at the negotiating table. He had differing views to the African National Congress when it came to structuring policies on land redistribution. He championed for a more radical policy, ‘One settler, one bullet' was a maxim used to stir up the black majority. Benny Alexander and the PAC tried to be the counterpoint to the African National Congress' negotiated settlement during the CODESA talks. This he hoped would swing many black supporters towards the PAC, in the lead up to the first democratic elections.

In 1993 he became chief negotiator for the Pan African Congress during South Africa's constitutional dialogue, but Patricia De Lille soon replaced him. Shortly after the 1994 elections Benny Alexander changed his name to Khoisan X as a political statement against South Africa's colonial past. Khoisan X was disturbed by the number of votes the National Party received from the Coloured voters in the Western Cape. This he partly attributed to the historical assimilation of the KhoiKhoi and San communities into the Cape Colony's eurocentric ways of organising society:. "The former colonists, upon their arrival, behaved like gods and recreated and renamed everything after themselves… It is therefore necessary that colonial names, symbols statues, river names, street names, airports… be removed".

In 1996 the PAC was looking to regain their image as a vanguard for Pan Africanism by inviting controversial religious leader Louis Farrakhan to South Africa. Shortly thereafter, Michael Jackson visited the country. Khoisan X had always publicly maintained that he shared a friendship with the pop star. It is reported that when Michael Jackson's private jet landed at Jan Smuts Airport he requested to see Khoisan X first before anyone else. In the year 2000 Khoisan X was rumoured to be planning a return into the political arena after he stepped down as Secretary-General in 1994. The PAC was looking to revive itself as the official opposition to the ANC, with the PAC's NEC looking to Khoisan X to take the charges, though this rumour proved not to be true. !X was, for a time, a member of the new formed Gauteng Provincial Legislature, and chaired a committee that decided on the name Gauteng for the province at the time called the PWV Province (Pretoria, Witwatersrand, Vaal Triangle). He stepped down as Secretary General in 1994.

== Indigenous rights and business interests ==
!X withdrew from politics in 1996/7, to focus on his studies, NGO and civic structures, and to build black empowerment structures, becoming a champion for indigenous interests, referring to his San and Griqua roots. He legally changed his name from Benny Alexander to Khoisan X, and acted as adviser to Adam Kok V, a Griqua leader in the Northern Cape. He set up Khoisan X Investment Holdings, which had earmarked the rest of the continent to secure business contracts. He also pursued business interests related to tourism. In 2008 he was part of an attempt to form a PAC splinter group - the Bloemfontein High Court however forbade the group from using the PAC's colours or name.

== Death and legacy ==
Khoisan X died of a stroke in Johannesburg. He was buried in Kimberley on 23 October 2010. A street in Galeshewe, Kimberley, "Benny Alexander Avenue", is named in his honour.

== See also ==
- Pan Africanist Congress of Azania
- CODESA
