= Dr Victor =

South African musician

Victor Khojane, better known as Dr Victor or Dr Vic, is a pop and R&B musician, who was born in Kimberley, South Africa.

== Career ==
Khojane began playing when he was a student, in a band called CC Beat, mainly influenced by afropop stars such as Blondie and Papa, Harare Mambo Band and Jonathan Butler, as well as some Afro-American acts (mainly the Jackson Five). In 1984, CC Beat began playing nightclubs in Johannesburg; at the time, they managed to sign with label CCP Records (an affiliate of EMI), but the contract was later dismissed. Another label, Dephon Records, put them under contract shortly thereafter. CC Beat changed their name to 'Taxi' and did sessions for Lucky Dube and other bands.

In 1991 the band changed label again, signing for independent label CSR. They recorded their first album, an Eddy Grant tribute entitled The Rasta Rebels. This work was highly successful, to the point that they decided to change the name of the band to Rasta Rebels. At about the same time, Khojane adopted the pseudonym Dr Victor.

Dr Victor then recorded a few solo albums, such as Badayo, Hello Afrika, and One Goal, One Wish. All these works were quite successful in South Africa, and Dr Victor was invited to open for international stars such as Paul Simon, Gloria Estefan and Janet Jackson. In 1997, Dr Victor's album Faya was his first work to get international attention, selling well in France, Mexico, Japan and the Middle East.

At the end of the 1990s, Dr Victor reunited the Rasta Rebels, and a collection, The Best of the Rasta Rebels with one unreleased track, "I Love to Truck", was released. Both the collection and the new song, published as a single, sold well. In the following years, Dr Victor has alternated solo productions (such as Sunshine Daze in 2003 and If You Wanna Be Happy in 2004) and Rasta Rebels albums (When Somebody Loves You Back, 2006).

== Discography ==
- The Rasta Rebels (1991)
- Badayo
- Hello Afrika
- Faya (1997)
- The Best of the Rasta Rebels (raccolta)
- Stress (2000)
- Sunshine Daze (2003)
- If You Wanna Be Happy (2004)
- When Somebody Loves You Back (2006), Electromode
