= Benjamin Bennett (writer) =

South African writer

Benjamin Bennett (1907–1985) was a well known South African crime writer. He worked as a journalist with the Cape Argus newspaper from 1925 to 1975, as a crime reporter, and subsequently as news editor and finally editor of Argus Action. He was born in London, England and emigrated with his family to Kimberley, South Africa, in 1912. He was educated at Kimberley Boys' High School.

Bennett's prodigious output of books reflects a close involvement, as crime reporter, both at the crime scene and in the courtroom, where his professional life regularly took him, pen and notebook in hand. It is said that, for his insight, he was even consulted by the police for the solving of certain complex cases. He is credited with having posed the most plausible scenarios for enduring murder mysteries, such as that of Bubbles Schroeder.

Bennett's books include:

- Down Africa's Skyways (1932)
- Up For Murder (1934) with François Pierre Rousseau
- Famous South African Murders (1938)
- Hitler Over Africa (1939)
- Too Late For Tears (1948)
- The Clues Condemn (1949)
- The Evil That Men Do (1950)
- Murder Is My Business (1951)
- Why Did They Do It? (1953)
- And Your Verdict? (1954)
- Destiny Comes Too Soon (1955)
- Freedom or the Gallows (1956)
- This Was A Man (1958)
- Genius For the Defense (1959)
- Murder Will Speak (1962)
- Why Women Kill (1965)
- Why Men Kill (1965)
- The Amazing Case of the Baron von Schauroth (1966)
- The Cohen Case (1971)
- They Crossed My Path (1972)
- Some Don't Hang (1973)
- The Noose Tightens (1974)
- Was Justice Done? The Scissors Murder (1975)

He also ghost-wrote Looking at My Heart (1968), the biography of Philip Blaiberg.
