= Phakamile Mabija =

African anti-Apartheid activist (died 1977)

Phakamile Mabija was an African anti-Apartheid activist who died while in police custody in 1977.

== Biography ==
Phakamile Mabija lived in Vergenoeg, in the Northern Cape. As a member of the Anglican Church's NOMAD team, he was a delegate in the National Youth Leadership Programme, which was a three and a half month training course initiated by the Anglican Church at the beginning of 1977. He was also politically affiliated with the ANC. He was detained by the South African Police on 27 June 1977 for alleged involvement in an incident when African and Coloured commuters stoned public transport during a bus boycott in Galeshewe, Kimberley, South Africa. Mabija was due to appear in court on 8 July 1977 under charges under the Riotous Assemblies Act, 1956. Mabija died in detention on 7 July 1977, the day before his scheduled court hearing. He plunged from the 6th floor of Transvaal Road police station in Kimberley. Mabija's death during detention was similar to those of Ahmed Timol (who plunged to his death from the 10th floor of the Johannesburg Central Police Station in 1971) and Matthews Mabelane (who plunged to his death from the 10th floor of the same building on February 15, 1977).

== Aftermath ==
The Dean of Kimberley, as Vicar General, received the news in the absence of Bishop Graham Charles Chadwick (Mabija was a full-time youth worker in the Anglican Parish of St James, Galeshewe. Upon his return, Chadwick took up the protest against Mabija's death (particularly after the inquest proved to be a fiasco) and the continued detention of his clergy. White wooden crosses were planted on the lawn outside Kimberley's St Cyprian's Cathedral for each day that the detentions continued, church bells being rung in protest.

== Inquest ==
Public outcry lead to an inquest into Phakamile Mabija's death, which was conducted by Amnesty International between August and September 1977. Assessed by Professor JA Oliver, a verdict was handed by JH Booysen, who was the magistrate. It was found that Mabija had sustained self-inflicted injuries jumping out of the 6th floor window. Therefore, nobody was deemed responsible for his death. During the Kimberley Security Police's testimony at the inquest, Colonel JD du Plessis alleged that the officer on duty at the time of Mabija's death opened a window to allow fresh air to ventilate the room, but they normally kept the windows shut. Sergeant Oscar Ntsiko corroborated with the Colonel's account, stating that he escorted Phakamile Mabija to the toilet, upon their return, he broke free and ran back into Officer Van der Merwe's office, where he jumped out of the open window. The Northern Cape Security Police had with them an alleged ANC pamphlet which encouraged detainees to take their own lives as an act of terrorism to the state. District surgeon Dr. TC Robertson's results from the post-mortem identified a fractured skull as Mabija's cause of death. Dr. BA Mahler, the independent pathologist brought in for the inquest, identified cuts on Mabija's face; liver and hands. He maintained that the bruises caused to Mabija's liver may have been as a result of assault.

== TRC ==
During her TRC testimony, Phakamile Mabija's mother, Shirley Mabija recalled the last time she had seen her son. He had been detained for two week prior to his death. On 7 July 1977 Sergeants Ntsiko and Du Plessis brought Phakamile Mabija home in order to locate documents that the police wanted him to produce. After a brief exchange with his mother Shirley, the police took Mabija back to prison. He died later that evening.

== Naming of streets to commemorate Phakamile Mabija ==
In 2009 steps were taken to rename the Transvaal Road Police Station in Mabija's memory, when initially Transvaal Road, Jones Street and Sidney Street, and then only Transvaal Road, in Kimberley would also become known as Phakamile Mabija Road. The renaming of Transvaal Road and Jones Street in Kimberley, as Phakamile Mabija Road, was marked by a ceremony held on Heritage Day 24 September 2011, following a commemorative lecture the previous evening. The city had previously named a street for Mabija, namely Phakamile Mabija Street, off Albert Luthuli Street, off John Daka, west of Otto's Kopje Mine. On the occasion of the renaming of Transvaal Road, in 2011, a memorandum was delivered at the Transvaal Road Police Station calling for it to be renamed "Phakamile Centre".

Mabija was commemorated also in the Northern Cape Department of Roads and Public Works initiative, the Phakamile Mabija Artisan Programme. Through this 2010-11 project 35 learners were placed at COEGA member companies in the Eastern Cape to receive working experience and access to further studies. A collective mural art project in Galeshewe, Kimberley, directed by Rochester Mafafu, vividly recalls the events surrounding Mabija's death. This was partly painted-over in 2013 (during local government building maintenance) but was subsequently restored by the artists

== See also ==
- Steve Biko
- Truth and Reconciliation Commission (South Africa)
