= Government Gazette of South Africa =

Official publication of the government of South Africa

Government Gazette; Staatskoerant
- Government Gazette 17737 from 1997, which states President Nelson Mandela promulgating when the Constitution of South Africa came into effect.
- Publisher: Government Printing Works
- Founded: 16 August 1800; 225 years ago As the Kaapsche Stads courant en Afrikaansche berigter or The Cape Town Gazette and African Advertiser
- Headquarters: 149 Bosman Street, Pretoria
- Country: South Africa
- Website: www.gpwonline.co.za/GPWGazettes.htm

The Government Gazette (Afrikaans: Staatskoerant) is the gazette of record of South Africa. It is the "official organ of Government". The Government Gazette is used by the government as an official way of communicating to the general public.

== Published material ==
The Gazette includes proclamations by the President as well as both general and government notices made by its various departments. It publishes regulations and notices in terms of acts, changes of names, company registrations and deregistrations, financial statements, land restitution notices, liquor licence applications and transport permits. Board and legal notices are also published in the Gazette; these cover insolvencies, liquidation and estate notices. Note that certain publishers such as Juta and Butterworths publish legislation in South Africa.

== Location ==
The current location of the government printing works is 149 Bosman Street, Pretoria, South Africa.
