= Wildebeest Kuil Rock Art Centre =

- Location: Kimberley, Northern Cape, South Africa
- Coordinates: 28°40′03″S 24°39′02″E
- Type: Cultural history, Archaeology museum
- Website: Wildebeest Kuil Rock Art Centre

Wildebeest Kuil Rock Art Centre is a rock engraving site with visitor centre on land owned by the !Xun and Khwe San situated about 16 km from Kimberley, Northern Cape, South Africa. It is a declared Provincial Heritage Site managed by the Northern Cape Rock Art Trust in association with the McGregor Museum. The engravings exemplify one of the forms often referred to as ‘Bushman rock art' – or Khoe-San rock art – with the rock paintings of the Drakensberg, Cederberg and other regions of South Africa being generally better known occurrences. Differing in technique, the engravings have many features in common with rock paintings. A greater emphasis on large mammals such as elephant, rhino and hippo, in addition to eland, and an often reduced concern with depicting the human form set the engravings apart from the paintings of the sub-continent.

== Rock Art and Other Archaeological Traces ==
=== Background ===
South Africa's rich heritage of rock art occurs in the form of engravings on the interior plains, and paintings in the more mountainous areas, their distributions overlapping in places. Different hunter-gatherer, herder, agriculturist and colonial rock art traditions have been discerned; while some variability may reflect a dynamic interplay of history and landscape which is not easily resolved in purely ethnic, culture and/or techno-economic terms.

The region bounded by the Vaal and Orange Rivers has a particularly concentrated distribution of engraving sites, of which Wildebeest Kuil (situated between Kimberley and Barkly West) is one.

=== Rock art records ===
The earliest records of rock engravings at Wildebeest Kuil are the copies made by George William Stow who was on the Diamond Fields in the early 1870s. In 1875, Stow sent copies of paintings and engravings, including those made here, to Dr Wilhelm Bleek in Cape Town: "their publication", wrote Bleek, "cannot but effect a radical change in the ideas generally entertained with regard to Bushmen and their mental condition." Several of the engravings copied by Stow are still to be seen on site, but others were removed towards the end of the nineteenth century. Some of these were exhibited at the Colonial and Indian Exhibition in London in 1886, and at least two rock engravings are preserved in the collection of the British Museum. It was Stow's copy that, in the 1960s, enabled positive identification of its origin.

The first systematic work on rock art in the region was the survey published by Maria Wilman. Gerhard and Dora Fock followed up Wilman's work in the 1960s-1970s, documenting in detail the engravings at the major sites of Bushman's Fountain, Kinderdam and Driekops Eiland, and at several hundred other locales in the Northern Cape and adjoining districts.

When G. and D. Fock documented Wildebeest Kuil in 1968, they recorded 178 individual engravings. Detailed plotting has since revealed hundreds more (including all human-made marks).

=== Engraving technique ===
Most of the engravings in the Kimberley area are made with the 'pecked' technique: a hard stone was used to chip away the outer crust of the rock, exposing the lighter coloured rock beneath. Sites north west of Kimberley are often on andesite outcrops (as at Wildebeest Kuil and Driekopseiland) while to the south, in Karoo geological settings, the koppies are mostly dolerite. With time, the exposed portions of the older engravings have become as dark as the outer crust through the build-up of patina.

Silvia Tomášková has carried out exploratory work at Wildebeest Kuil, approaching the engravings as instances of 'purposefully modified stone' that offer opportunities to think about skills and materials in a context of embodied practice carried out by individuals in a larger social context.

=== The age of the engravings ===
The pecked engravings of the area are estimated to span a period from perhaps a few hundred to possibly several thousand years ago. Direct cation ratio dating methods applied at Klipfontein, giving estimates spanning the entire Holocene, hinge, however, on a calibration curve of uncertain reliability, and the samples were too small to run more than one assay each. Hairline engravings, known from a few sites in this area and more commonly in the Karoo, are consistently beneath pecked engravings in superimposed sequences, and are thus older. Butzer used geomorphological evidence to infer bracketing ages for the engravings at Bushmans Fountain and Driekopseiland, with the resulting scenario being in broad accord with more recent work on palaeoenvironmental change at a regional scale, as well as with findings at other sites, and observations of associated archaeological material. At Wildebeest Kuil some of the engravings were undoubtedly made by Later Stone Age occupants of the site 1200–1800 years ago, as suggested by the radiocarbon readings cited below.

=== Interpreting the engravings ===
Given a shamanistic understanding of the art, the Wildebeest Kuil engravings may well relate to beliefs about the rain and rain-making. Medicine people or shamans could access the spirit world through altered states of consciousness and harness supernatural power to heal the sick, control animals, and make rain. It is possible that many of the engravings were inspired by visions experienced in altered states of consciousness, and depicted on the rocks so that others could share and draw inspiration from them. It also appears that places selected for making engravings were chosen for their significance in relation to these beliefs.

=== Stone circles and stone artefacts ===
Stone circles and clearings, containing Later Stone Age occupation or activity debris, on and around the hill were noted by Stow in the 1870s. One, near the crest of the hill, was excavated in 1983 by Beaumont, yielding two Later Stone Age aggregates – a Wilton assemblage overlain by Ceramic Later Stone Age, with associated radiocarbon readings of 1790±60 BP and 1230±80 BP.

J.H. Power had picked up here a pressure-flaked tanged and barbed stone arrowhead – this being an example of distinctive artefacts which occur as unusual "trace objects" at a number of post-2000 BP sites from Lesotho into the western interior, which have been interpreted as stone skeuomorphs of iron originals.

=== Kousop’s residence ===
A comment made to Louis Péringuey in 1909 by missionary Westphal refers to the last Khoe-San occupants of the site being “'Scheelkoos' and his family" – a rare reference to a named Khoe-San individual from the protocolonial frontier era in South Africa. Scheelkoos, also known as Kousop, led resistance to colonial settlement in the region, and was killed with 130 of his followers, in a counter-attack, on the banks of the nearby Vaal River in 1858.

=== Colonial era sites ===
Colonial era ruins and middens, of hotel sites dating from the 1870s-early twentieth century, and those linked with twentieth century farm-workers, occur on the fringes of the hill and are subject to on-going research.

== !Xun and Khwe ownership of the farm ==
Since 1996 the farm of Wildebeest Kuil has been owned by the !Xun and Khwe communities. These two San groups, speaking distinct Khoe-San languages and having different histories, had been caught up in political turmoil in Angola in the 1960s and 1970s, and subsequently in Namibia. In 1990, at the time of Namibia's independence, some 4000 of them (men then employed by the South African Defence Force together with their families) were flown to a tent-town at Schmidtsdrift, west of Kimberley. This area was subsequently awarded to its former Tswana owners in a land claim, forcing the !Xun and Khwe to move again. Having purchased Wildebeest Kuil and adjoining farms, resettlement from the Schmidtsdrift tent towns to a new housing scheme at Platfontein on the outskirts of Kimberley took place in 2003–5.

As the owners today of the land on which the Wildebeest Kuil engravings occur, the !Xun and Khwe see in the art a link (as do other Khoe-San descendants in the region) to a broad Khoe-San cultural inheritance in Southern Africa.

== Public access ==
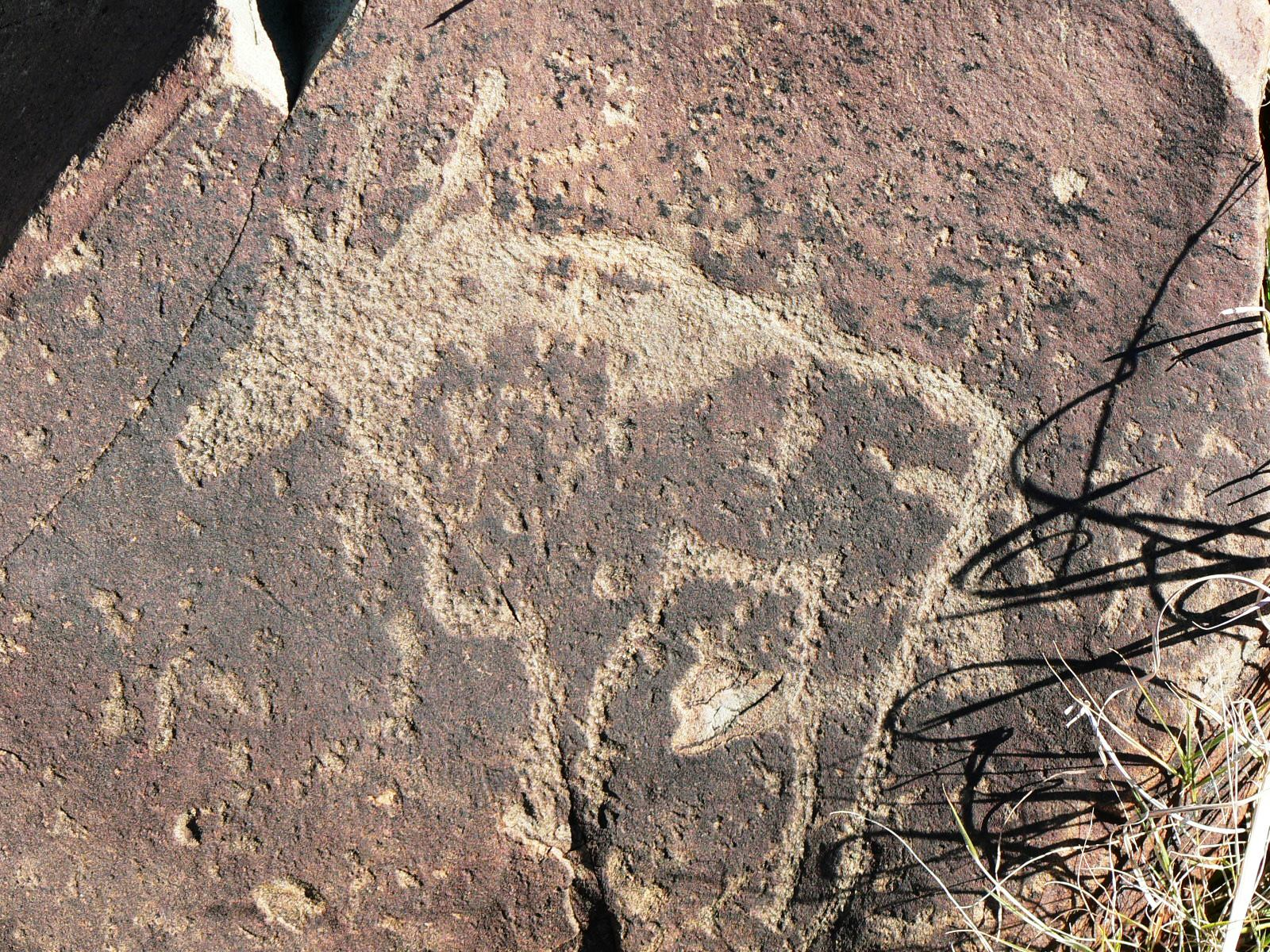
Rock engraving at Wildebeest Kuil on which the logo of 'Ngwao Boswa Kapa Bokoni', the provincial heritage resources authority of the Northern Cape' is based.

Plans by the McGregor Museum to develop the site for public access date back to at least the mid-1990s, and these were discussed with the !Xun and Khwe CPA after they took ownership of the farm. Funding became available in 2000 from the Department of Environmental Affairs and Tourism, through the Rock Art Research Institute. The project to establish the Wildebeest Kuil Rock Art Centre (opened December 2001 by Northern Cape Premier Manne Dipico and Cheryl Carolus) was driven by a steering committee formed in Kimberley, with representation from the Rock Art Research Institute, the McGregor Museum, community members (!Xun and Khwe and other Khoe-San organisations), and a range of further stakeholders. Out of this committee grew the Northern Cape Rock Art Trust which now manages the site.

With funding support through its link with the McGregor Museum, the site employs custodians who guide visitors and school groups to the engravings and other heritage features.

Nominated by the Northern Cape Rock Art Trust in 2006 as a Provincial Heritage Site, the Wildebeest Kuil rock art site was declared, on 19 September 2008, as the first new Provincial Heritage Site since the implementation, in 2000, of the National Heritage Resources Act.

== Gallery ==
Selection of rock carvings

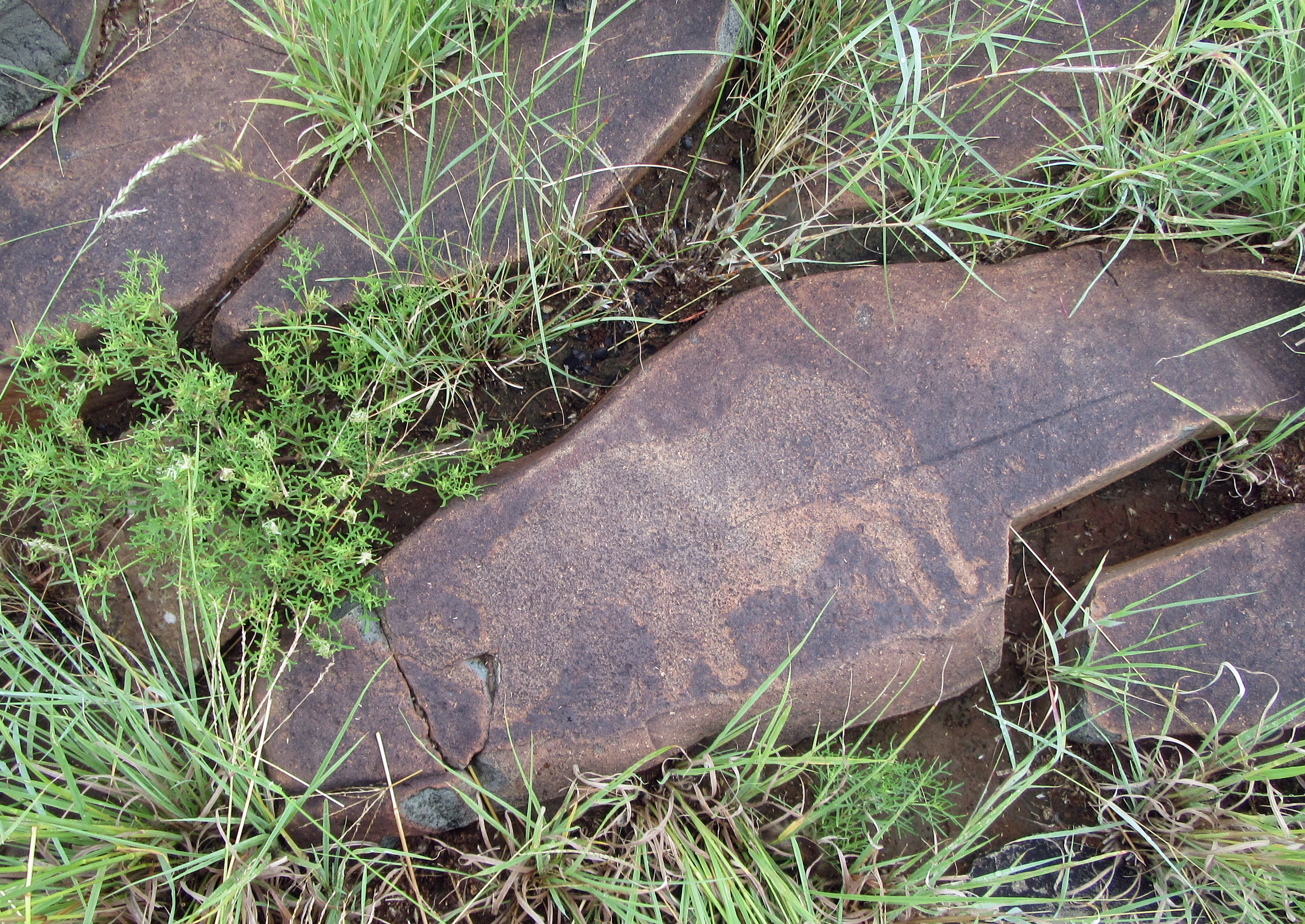
Rhino carving

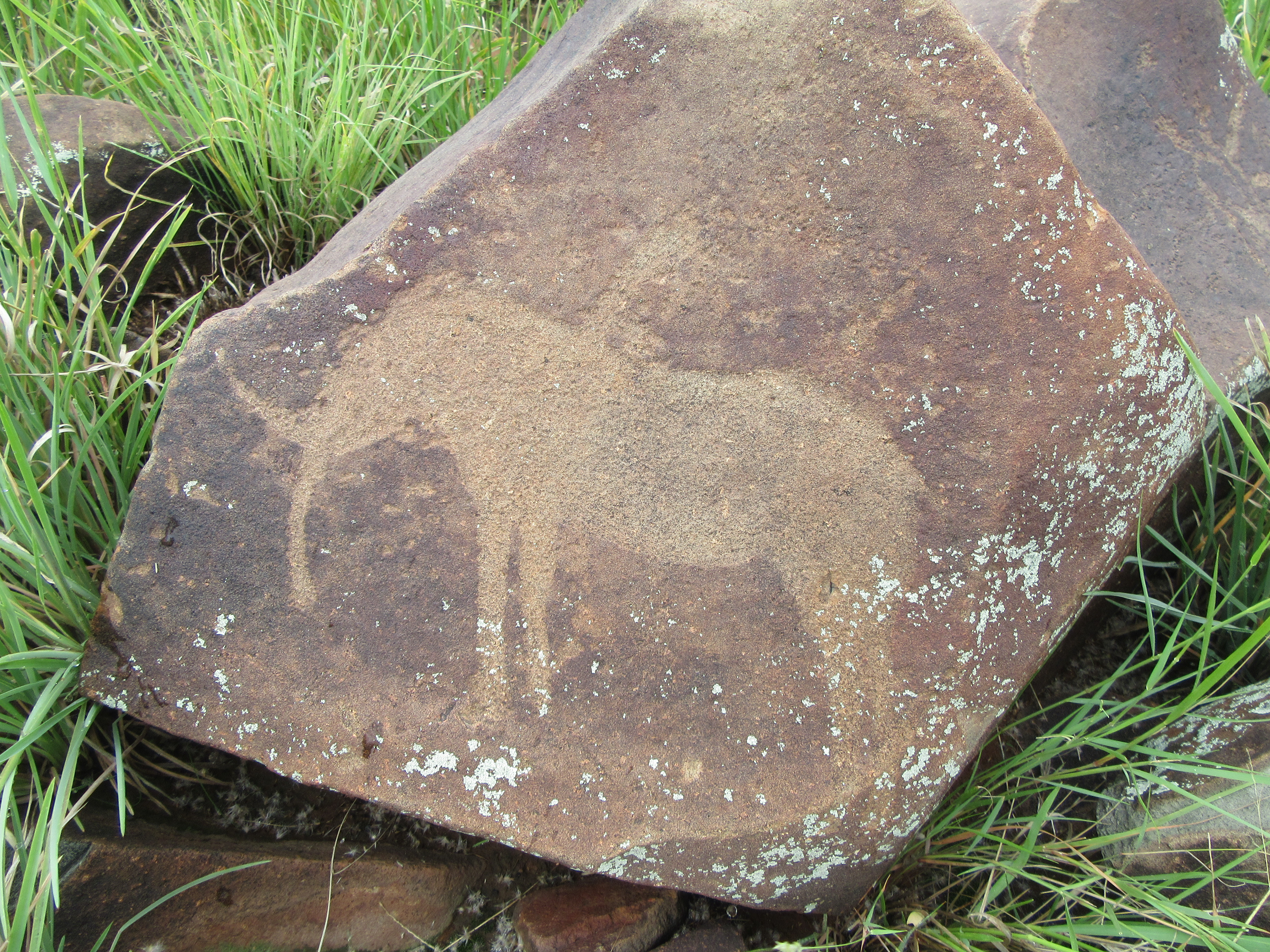
Elephant carving

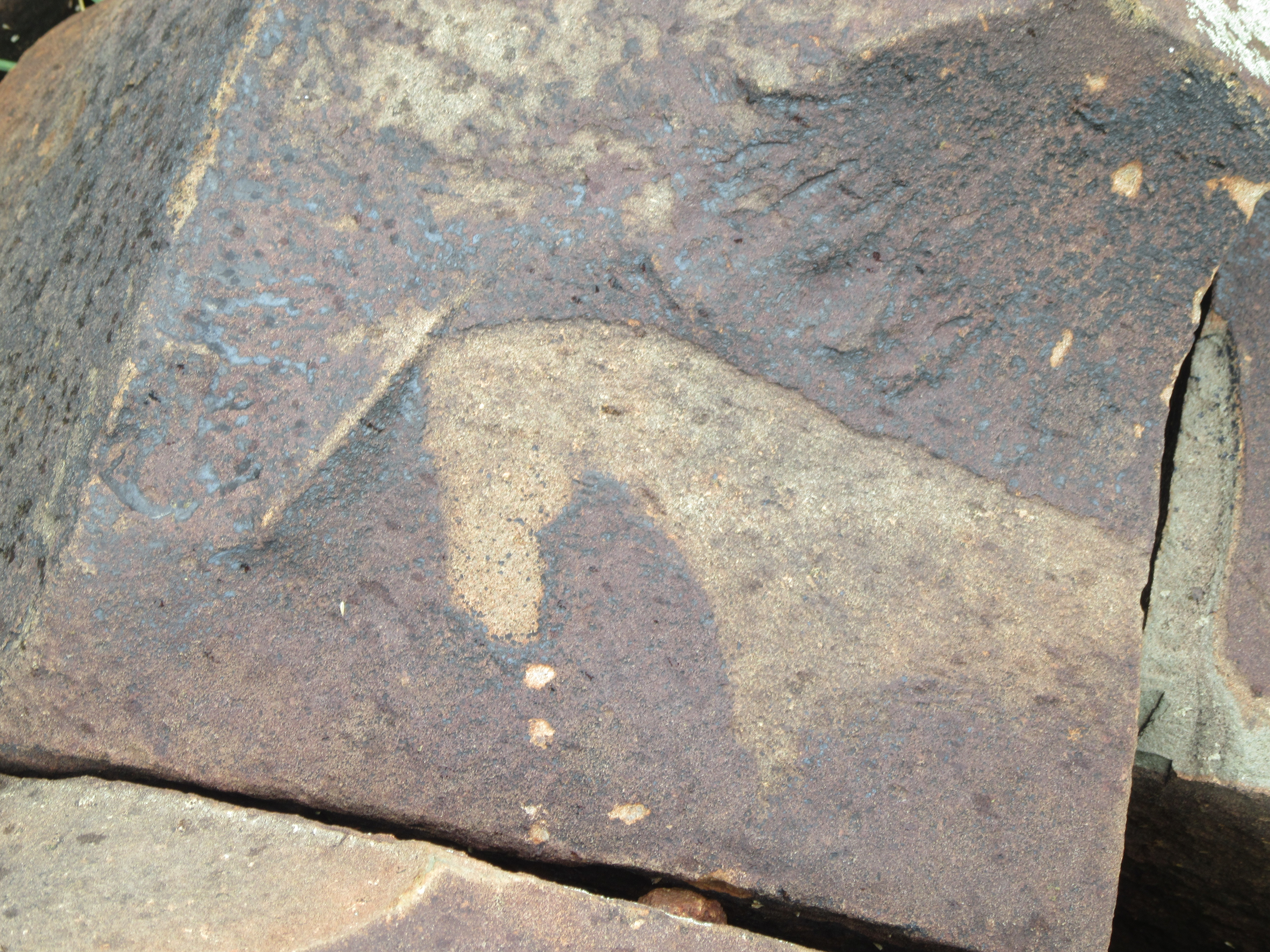
Possible Quagga carving

== Other nearby rock art sites ==
- Driekops Eiland
- Nooitgedacht
- Wonderwerk Cave
