= Maukala =

- Town
- Location in Rajasthan, India Maukala (India)
- Coordinates: 27.14°N 74.51°E
- Country: India
- State: Rajasthan
- District: Nagaur

Government
  - Maharaj Saheb Shri: Jabar Singh Chouhan

Population (1901)
  - Total: 18,000

Languages
  - Official: Hindi
- Time zone: UTC+5:30 (IST)
- PIN: 341510

Maukala is a city in Merta Taluk, Nagaur District of the State of Rajasthan in India. It is also referred to as Mokala or Myokal in some texts. Merta City is bounded by Mokala in the west.
