= Kousop =

Kousop (also rendered Kausob or Kausobson), birth date unknown, killed in a battle at Slypklip, Vaal River, near Kimberley, Northern Cape, South Africa, on 6 July 1858, was the leader of a group of San or Khoe-San who inhabited the area between the Modder, Riet and Vaal Rivers, western Orange Free State, in the mid nineteenth century.

== Kousop's resistance to settler encroachment ==
From the mid-1840s Kousop enters the archival record contesting what he believed was a fraudulent transaction, which took place at the future Boshof, in the year 1839, by which a vast tract of land passed into white ownership. In an attempt to dissipate friction, officials from the Republic granted Kousop a farm along the Vaal River. However, tensions only mounted after further complaints to the Orange Free State Republic were dismissed and Kouskop and a gang took the law in their own hands.

== The 1858 rising ==
During May and June 1858, while the Orange Free State was engaged in war with the Basotho, Kousop launched a number of attacks on farms, including Benaauwdheidsfontein (Benfontein), now on the outskirts of Kimberley. Goliath Yzerbek and Gasibonwe, a Tlhaping Kgosi at Taung, were among Kousop’s allies. In retaliation, a commando of 400 men – composed of 240 burgers, a number of Mfengu, and Khoe-San who were loyal to the burgers – was called up and equipped with a canon. On 6 July 1858 they surrounded Kousop and his followers upstream from what is now Riverton, in the vicinity of “Khossopskraal”, on the Vaal River, and forced them to surrender after a battle of three hours. Kousop himself with about 130 of his people, consisting of San, Khoekhoe, Korana and Griqua, were killed in the battle and 43 men and 50 women were captured.

The subsequent ambush and massacre of male prisoners, as they were being taken from Boshof to stand trial in Bloemfontein, was never fully investigated and came to represent a major miscarriage of justice. It is known to have caused much personal indignation and anguish on the part of President Boshof, at the head of a young Republic finding itself not quite able or, locally, willing to enforce its authority. However, upon the President’s instructions, the women and children from Kousop’s group, who had been captured and divided among the local farmers as indentured labour, were freed.

== Assessments of Kousop ==
Much contemporary and historical writing dismissed Kousop, or Scheelkobus, as he was known on account of an injured eye, as a robber and a gangster. Some writers were more sympathetic, for example, the geologist George William Stow who was writing in the 1880s. Kousop is the hero in historical fiction by the Afrikaans writer Dolf van Niekerk.

The Tswana Kgosi Mahura observed in a letter to Boshof at the time that he had “realised that a little spark would ignite the entire country” and that Kousop might “bring fire to our land.” The historian Karel Schoeman writes that the documentation surrounding Kousop’s “sustained protest against his dispossession” is a valuable record of the “vain attempts by an indigenous leader” to assert his authority in the face of farmers taking over his land. Frustration over his powerlessness “eventually drove him to large-scale violence.” Schoeman adds that the support he received from various indigenous groups demonstrates how “he embodied sentiments that were real and widely felt.”

The conclusive way in which Kousop’s resistance, and that of Gasibonwe of the Trans-Vaal, were suppressed and, more specifically, the alleged murder of the prisoners of Kousop’s gang, “made a profound impression upon the indigenous people, and did much to discourage future resistance and to consolidate the position of the farmers in the two republics.”

== Commemoration ==
A century and a half after his death near what would become Kimberley, Kousop is judged a champion for indigenous rights. As a leader Kousop was able, remarkably, to mobilize multi-ethnic opposition to colonial encroachment. But the odds were ultimately stacked against him and his people, and their resistance was suppressed with considerable violence.

On Sunday 6 July 2008, the 150th anniversary of the battle in which Kousop and about 130 of his followers were killed, the South African San Institute, as part of its ‘Footprints of the San’ project, and in association with the !Xun and Khwe communities, the Friends of Wildebeest Kuil and the Northern Cape Rock Art Trust, hosted the unveiling (by the Revd Mario Mahongo) of an inscribed stone on the edge of the hill at Wildebeest Kuil. One historical reference speaks of Kousop as living, at some period in his life, at the hill which is now the Wildebeest Kuil Rock Art Centre outside Kimberley. To commemorate the life of this hero of anti-colonial resistance, the programme additionally included the ceremonial lighting of a fire, creation of a memorial cairn, and traditional dancing. Speakers included the Revd Mario Mahongo and Barend van Wyk.

The memory of Kousop had been reflected in the story line at Wildebeest Kuil since the site opened in 2001. The commemoration of 6 July 2008 placed this story more centre-stage, to initiate a process to grant greater recognition to a significant figure in the resistance to colonial conquest in central South Africa in the mid nineteenth century.
