= History of the Northern Cape =

The concept of the Northern Cape as a distinct geo-political region of South Africa coalesced in the 1940s when a "Northern Cape and Adjoining Areas Regional Development Association" was formed and the first map featuring the name "Northern Cape" was published. The geographic spread to which the term applied was not fixed until 1994, however, when it attained precise definition as the Northern Cape Province, one of South Africa's nine post-apartheid provinces. Since then there have been boundary adjustments to include parts of the former Bophuthatswana (transferred from North West Province) adjacent to Kuruman and Hartswater. Vryburg and Mafikeng, in the north eastern extremity of the former Cape Province - and hence regarded as part of the pre-1994 "Northern Cape" - are excluded, being part, now, of the North West Province in the North.

A History of the Northern Cape, properly speaking, would cover this recent period only. The different regional histories of the area now known as the Northern Cape nevertheless have certain common themes. It is, in the title of an important study by historian Nigel Penn, The Forgotten Frontier in South African history. Part of the history in question is also a pivotal one that heralded the modern era in the subcontinent, revolving on mineral wealth (pre-eminently on the Diamond Fields), industrialisation, migrant labour and the compound/hostel system, urbanisation and systematic segregation. This combination of processes and phenomena has been referred to by historians as the mineral revolution in South Africa.

== Precolonial history ==
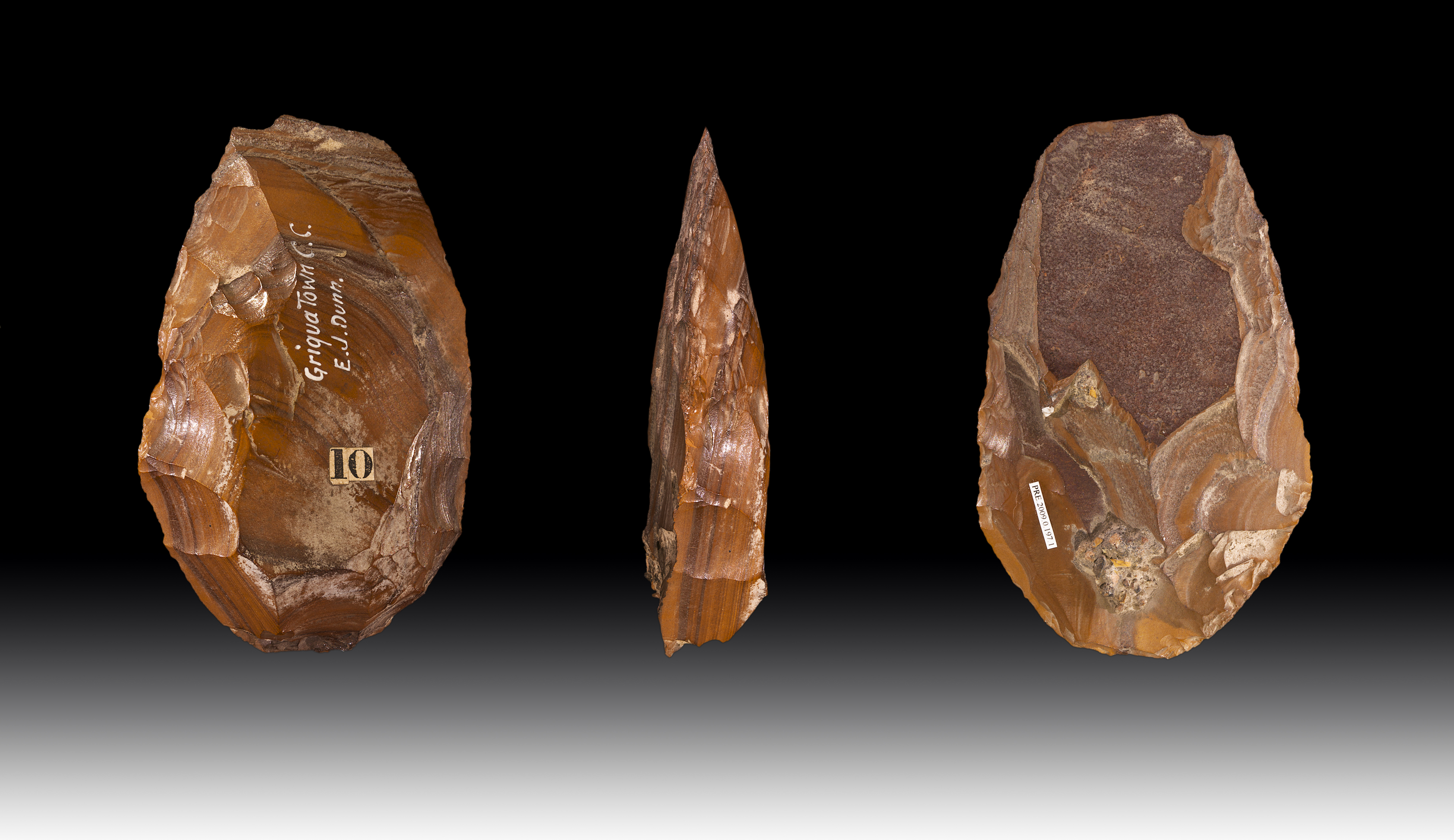
FlintBifaceLower Paleolithic- Former collection of Edward John Dunn

It has been said: "The South African central plateau is unique in the world...in that it supported large numbers of non-farming people who were also prolific makers of stone tools until very recent times. A brief comparison of surveys conducted elsewhere in the world reveals promptly and unambiguously that South Africa is richer in Stone Age remains than any other place on earth."

There was little general appreciation of this as a result of apartheid education: “To look at the history of South Africa [as it has been taught in our schools]," remarked Prof N.J. van der Merwe, Professor of Archaeology at the University of Cape Town, "is to look at human events through the wrong end of a telescope.”

Major sites that have relevance include Wonderwerk Cave near Kuruman, Canteen Kopje near Barkly West, a cluster of archaeological sites at Kathu, the Wildebeest Kuil Rock Art Centre on the road from Kimberley to Barkly West, sites in the ǀXam and ǂKhomani heartland, particularly rock art sites in the Karoo, and the stone walled ruins at Dithakong north east of Kuruman.

== Genocide ==
The arrival of the European colonists exacerbated the conflict among the warring tribes in the Northern Cape. Colonial interactions gave the pastoralist tribes of Griqua, Baster, Korana, and other groups access to more advanced tools of war. Particularly, Griqua and Korana became more formidable, creating commando forces armed with firearms and horses for the purpose of killing the Sans while raiding their stocks. Succeeding developments led to the eventual genocide of this ethnic group. For instance, when it was discovered that the merino sheep was able to acclimatise to the Bushmanland, pastoralists had more cause to encroach on San territory. This was further reinforced by the development of the borehole technology for accessing groundwater, which made the semi-desert conditions livable. Finally, when copper was discovered in the area, San also became the target of the Boers and the Baster farmers pursuing commercial interests beginning in the 1850s. Aside from a series of massacres, the Boers further contributed to the genocide through their activities that induced the San's forced migration. All these effectively ended the independent San society in the Northern Cape in the 1860s.

Louis Anthing first drew attention to the San's plight, exposing the acts of genocide against them in the Bushmanland/Upper Karoo area after the colonial boundary was extended to the Orange River in 1847. He revealed this in his remarkable letter to the Cape parliament in 1863. The government did not address Anthing's report and recommendations to protect what was left of the San due to the cost it would incur. Current research by Jose Manuel de Prada-Samper, Pippa Skotnes and colleagues begins to highlight this episode in South African history.

== Struggle History ==
In the 1980s the Northern Cape contributed in a relatively limited way to the struggle for a democratic dispensation in South Africa, it has been suggested. One study attributes this primarily to geographic and demographic factors: the province (as defined in 1994) covers some 30 percent of the country but has the smallest population, which stood at 840 000 people in 1994, representing just 2,1 percent of South Africa's total population. With a density of 2.3 persons per square kilometre, political mobilization was constrained except in the major centres of this vast tract of the country. That Afrikaans was first language to two thirds of the people (the dominant group, at 52 percent, were ‘Coloureds’) could have been a significant further factor. Leaders who arose at this time in Kimberley included two future Premiers of the Northern Cape, Manne Dipico and Elizabeth Dipuo Peters.

== Post-1994 ==
The Northern Cape as it is now known came into being in 1994. Boundary adjustments resulted in the addition of certain parts of North West Province.

Premiers of the Northern Cape have been: Manne Dipico, Dipuo Peters and Hazel Jenkins.

== Resources on the history of the Northern Cape ==
See:

- The struggle for liberation and freedom in the Northern Cape, 1850-1994, by Vida Allen, Sephai Mngqolo and Sunet Swanepoel, published by the McGregor Museum, Kimberley, 2012.
- McGregor Museum
- Wildebeest Kuil Rock Art Centre
