= Platfontein =

San Community

Platfontein is a community located in an arid region of the Northern Cape Province, 15 kilometers outside the city of Kimberley. The community consists of two San peoples, the !Kung and the Khwe. “The San of Platfontein” is a collective name used for both the !Kung and Khwe.

== History ==
The residents of Platfontein originate from the northern parts of Namibia and southern Angola. In both Namibia and Angola, the !Kung and the Khwe were militarised first by the Portuguese Army during the Angolan War of Independence. They had been part of the Flechas, a unit of the Portuguese Special Forces. With the People's Movement for the Liberation of Angola (MPLA) assuming power in Angola in November 1975, many joined the South African National Defence Force

In the South African National Defence Force, these San soldiers were part of 31 Battalion (SWATF) fighting at a base called Omega, located in the Western Caprivi, the Zambezi region of Namibia, on the Namibian border with Angola. “The San of Platfontein” were involved in counter-insurgency operations during the South African Border War. This war was between the South African Defence Force, in alliance with the South-West Africa Territory Force, against the People’s Liberation Army of Namibia, the active military wing of SWAPO. The conflict spanned a period, from 1966 to 1989.

This war service was not always voluntary: in 1998 the Truth and Reconciliation Commission heard several first-hand accounts of forced conscription and brutal treatment of men in the battalion. The San of the battalion were used for their tracking skills. 31 battalion were disbanded on 7 March 1993 and the memorabilia of the battalion

== Housing ==
When the battalion was disbanded, the SANDF relocated approximately 4000 !Kung and Khwe soldiers, men, women and children from the Omega base to Mangetti Dune in Bushmanland, Namibia, and then to Schmidtsdrift in South Africa. In Schmidtsdrift they lived in makeshift army tents. The land on which the San were living at Schmidtsdrift formed part of the ancestral lands of ethnic Tswana, Bathlaping and a group of Griqua people. The claim to the land by these groups was approved in April 2000, and the San of Schmidtsdrift had to be relocated. They were relocated to Platfontein where they reside today in a small community. Before the !Kung and Khwe were relocated to Platfontein, it was abandoned farmland.

Under the Land Redistribution Programme, the Department of Land Affairs identified Platfontein as possible land to settle the !Kung and the Khwe people. In May 1999, former South African President Nelson Mandela presented the community with the title deed for this land. The residents of Platfontein number about 7 000 people. They live in low-income, government-built Reconstruction and Development Programme housing. Since being handed over by the Department of Housing, these RDP houses have not all been provided with proper water, sanitation and electricity by the Sol Plaatje Local Municipality.

Despite being relocated and settled together, the !Kung and Khwe have chosen to live in different parts of the settlement due to differences in the community; in Platfontein the basic services that are available are a school, two shops, a municipal building and a health clinic which both the !Kung and Khwe share.

== Culture ==
The San community of Platfontein are former hunting, foraging, and pastoral people. The community has been subject to complex socio-economic and political changes. Traditionally the San, lived a mobile life closely associated with the seasonal availability of water supplies. The San of Platfontein are traditionally nomadic, moving around in search of food and making temporary dwellings. Being in permanent homes has disrupted this traditional way of life. Many of the Khwe traditions such as folklore and storytelling, tracking, traditional music and healing dances are being lost and giving way to the modern practices and ways of living preferred by the younger generation.

The South African Broadcasting Corporation (SABC) has a radio station called X-K FM located in Platfontein. The station and the community are involved in making of radio programs in !Kung and the Khwe languages. 56 per cent of the population speak !Kung and 35 per cent of the population speaks Khwe. These efforts are aimed at preserving culture, identity and languages. !Kung and the Khwe languages are disappearing, because Afrikaans and English are the main languages used at schools and public services.

== See also ==
- Inequality in post-apartheid South Africa
- San people
- Khwe language
- !Kung
