= Driekops Eiland =

Coordinates: 28°59′18″S 24°13′22″E

Driekops Eiland (also called Driekopseiland) is a rock engraving or petroglyph site in the bed of the Riet River close to the town of Plooysburg, near Kimberley, Northern Cape, South Africa.

== The engravings ==
There are more than 3500 individual engravings at this site, predominantly pecked geometric images, occur on glaciated basement rock exposed in the bed of the river and are submerged when the river rises. Archaeologists and geomorphologists have estimated that the engravings may have been made in two episodes – before about 2500 years ago and after about 1000 years ago.

== Debates ==
The site has been at the centre of a number of debates about South African rock engravings.

Sensational claims about the site and makers of the engravings are advanced by Brenda Sullivan, Cyril Hromnik and others in books such as Spirit of the rocks. The ideas set out by these authors, often involving ancient visitors from foreign lands, and alleged links between the engravings and Ogham inscriptions, are rejected by archaeologists.

Within the archaeological fraternity the site has become important in collegial debates on authorship of rock art in Southern Africa.

Amongst rock art specialists there are two principal ideas concerning Driekops Eiland. One of them suggests that whereas sites such as the nearby Wildebeest Kuil, with its profusion of engravings of animals and some human figures, is quintessentially San/hunter-gatherer in character, the site of Driekops Eiland, with its massive preponderance of geometric engravings and very few animals and hardly any human figures, most likely belongs to a different tradition of rock art, now believed to be a separate Khoekhoe herder rock art tradition. This has been a persuasive argument, and the distribution of sites with geometric rock art appears to match the hypothesised migration routes by which herders are thought to have spread through South Africa about 2000 years ago.

A different perspective on Driekops Eiland does not discount this possibility, that different identity groups have given rise to some of the variability between sites, but questions whether assigning variability in terms of ethnic or cultural differences in the first instance does not perhaps overlook degrees of complexity and other possible factors. This approach draws on archaeological sources, ethnographic clues, and palaeo-environmental data to suggest that the environmental setting of the site was a locus of particular cultural and social significance. Ethnographic accounts, including those with reference to the social significance of water, show how features in the landscape could be imbued with meaning. Places and rock faces could become meaningful supports, mediating spirit worlds, the surfaces bearing the rock art images being a “most fundamental part of the context”.

=== The engravings as residues of ritual practices ===
Ethnographic sources, moreover, refer to ritual practices, specifically the female puberty rites, which have (or had) a specific geographical focus at the water source. Facial or body marking, and sometimes the daubing of objects, with ochre, scarification, and other modes, was a widely consistent feature of the ceremonies of reintroduction that concluded the rites (the literature is vast, from across the Khoe-San spectrum)

In Khoe-San ethnography, the spirit worlds over and under the earth are mediated by water in the form of rain and the waterhole It has been argued, that the hypothesized ritual practices and the rich field of social meanings in Khoe-San beliefs in relation to !Khwa, the rain/water (or its manifestation as a mythical ‘watersnake’), and the initiate, referred to as the ‘new maiden’, can be conceived as converging in the nearly palpable power of place at Driekops Eiland – where glacially smoothed basement rock, aligned with the flow of the river, ‘bulges’ and ‘dips’, snake-like, above or below the water according to the season. The site resonates with environmental rhythms, and these, in turn, were very likely resources for cultural construal. Upon this great, smooth, undulating surface (itself perhaps construed as a giant, fecund ‘watersnake’ – associated with rivers in many tales), more than 3,500 rock engravings are densely placed, such that they become submerged when the rains come in the wet season, but equally are left high and dry when river flow dwindles, or ceases altogether.

As a powerful place, it is possible that Driekops Eiland became – in this view – a focus in rites, perhaps specifically those associated with the ‘new maiden’, who represented “the rain’s magic power” (according to ≠Kamme-an, Dia!kwain’s mother); that the place itself was an active element in these rites in the redefinition of social personhood; and that the power of the place was enhanced in particular periods in its history (perhaps periods of ritual intensification in response to environmental and/or social stress) by marking with engravings, which themselves may be a residue of ritual sequence. These rituals are or were practised with great emotional and symbolic intensity.

It is suggested that a metaphorical understanding of place – and the possibility that different parts of the landscape might vary in ritual significance (hilltops very likely being associated with rain-making rites) – may be factors more germane to the questions of variability in the rock art of the region than appeals primarily to ethnicity and cultural difference.

== Formal protection ==
Driekops Eiland was declared a National Monument in 1944. It automatically became a Grade 2 Provincial Heritage Site when the National Heritage Resources Act (Act 25 of 1999) was promulgated.

== Detrimental impacts ==
A weir was built across the upper part of the site in 1942, causing permanent submergence of an estimated 150 engravings above the weir, and changing flood dynamics and silt accumulation patterns. The latter triggered, in turn, increased reed growth and an invasion of eucalyptus saplings across silted parts of the site - helped along by increased flow after a canal was built from the Orange River to the Kalfontein Dam (on the Riet River) in 1987.

== Driekops Eiland in art, literature and film ==
- The artist Walter Battiss knew the site as a youngster and wrote about it in publications on rock engravings.
- Randy Hartzenberg produced After Driekopseiland in 1989, now hanging at the Iziko South African National Gallery in Cape Town.
- Strijdom van der Merwe used Driekops Eiland images in his exhibition 'Messages of the Southern Earth' at the University of Johannesburg Gallery in 2005.
- Julia Martin devotes a chapter to a visit to Driekops Eiland in her book A Millimetre of Dust.
- Michael Cope's anthology Ghaap has a poem Rock Engravings on a Glacial Floor inspired by Driekops Eiland.
- The site features in numerous documentary films including an episode of A country imagined (with Johnny Clegg, Curious Pictures, 2010).
- The artist Willem Boshoff was inspired by the history of Driekopseiland when he made his sculpture "Thinking Stone" for the University of the Free State.

== Other rock engraving sites in the region ==
- Wildebeest Kuil Rock Art Centre
- Nooitgedacht Glacial Pavements
