= Plooysburg =

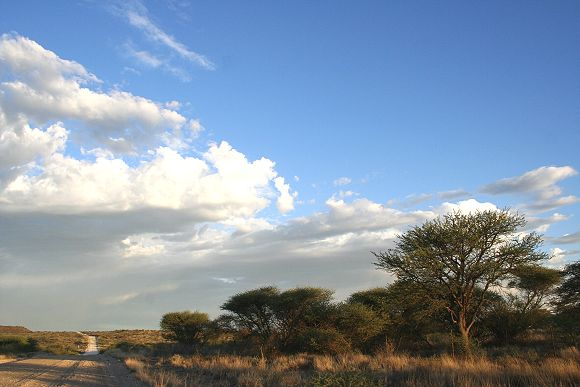
- Plooysburg

- Location within Northern Cape Location within South Africa
- Coordinates: 29°01′S 24°14′E
- Country: South Africa
- Province: Northern Cape
- District: Pixley ka Seme
- Municipality: Siyancuma

Population
  - Total: 594
- Time zone: UTC+2 (SAST)
- PO box: 8350
- Area code: 053

Plooysburg is a small town about 70 km west of Kimberley, Northern Cape, South Africa. It is situated close to the Riet River. The town took its name from the Du Plooy family, one of the original families of white settlers. With a church, school, police station and shop it serves a local farming and farm-worker community. Nearby is the rock art site of Driekops Eiland, and the Mokala National Park.
