= 31 Battalion (SWATF) =

South African army unit

31 Battalion/201 Battalion
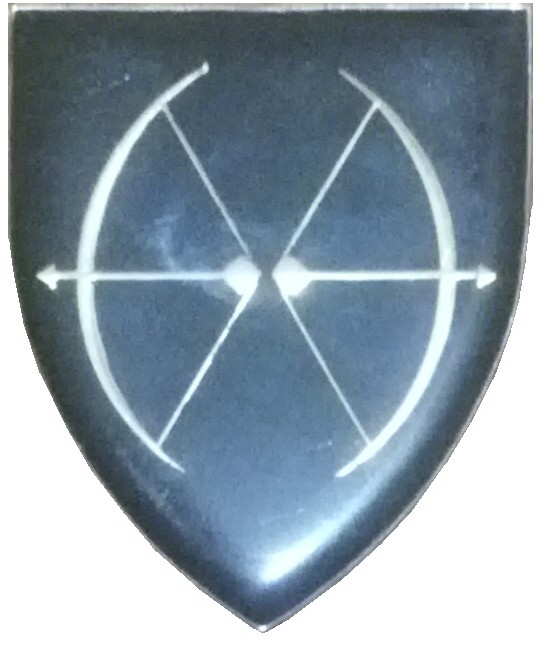
- SWATF / SADF 201/31 Battalion emblem
- Active: 1974 Alpha Group, 1975 Battalion
- Disbanded: 7 March 1993
- Country: Namibia, South Africa
- Allegiance: South Africa
- Branch: South African Army
- Type: Light Infantry
- Role: Counter Insurgency
- Part of: South African Defence Force, later South West African Territorial Force
- Garrison/HQ: Omega
- Nicknames: Bushman Battalion, The Crows
- Mottos: Alpha et Omega English: First and Last

Commanders
- OC 1974-1977: Commandant Delville Linford
- OC 1977-1978: Major C.P. Upton
- OC 1978-1980: Commandant P.W. Hall
- OC 1980-1982: Commandant F.A. Botes
- OC 1982-1986: Commandant B.M.Adams
- OC 1986-1986: Commandant J. Jooste
- OC 1986-1987: Commandant P.D. van der Merwe
- OC 1987-1989: Commandant C.J. Saunders

Insignia
- Identification symbol: Crow
- Part of the South West African Territorial Force

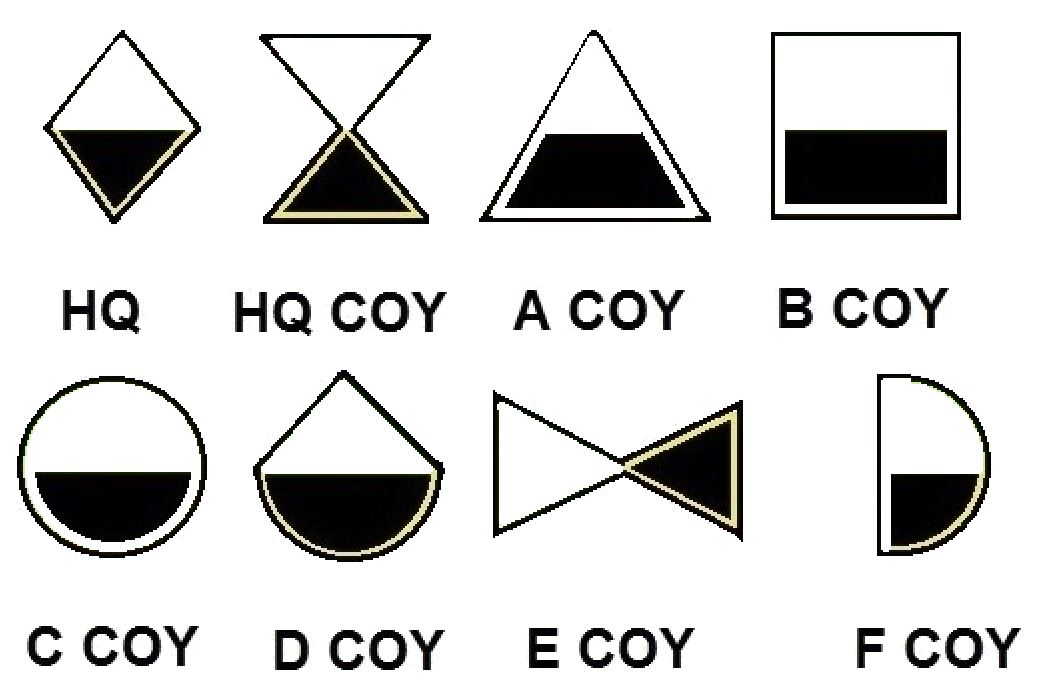
- Company Insignia

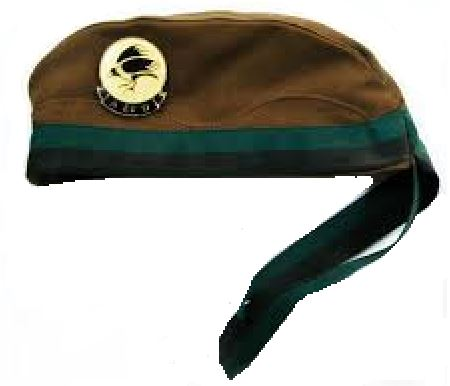
- SWATF 31 Battalion bonnie cap

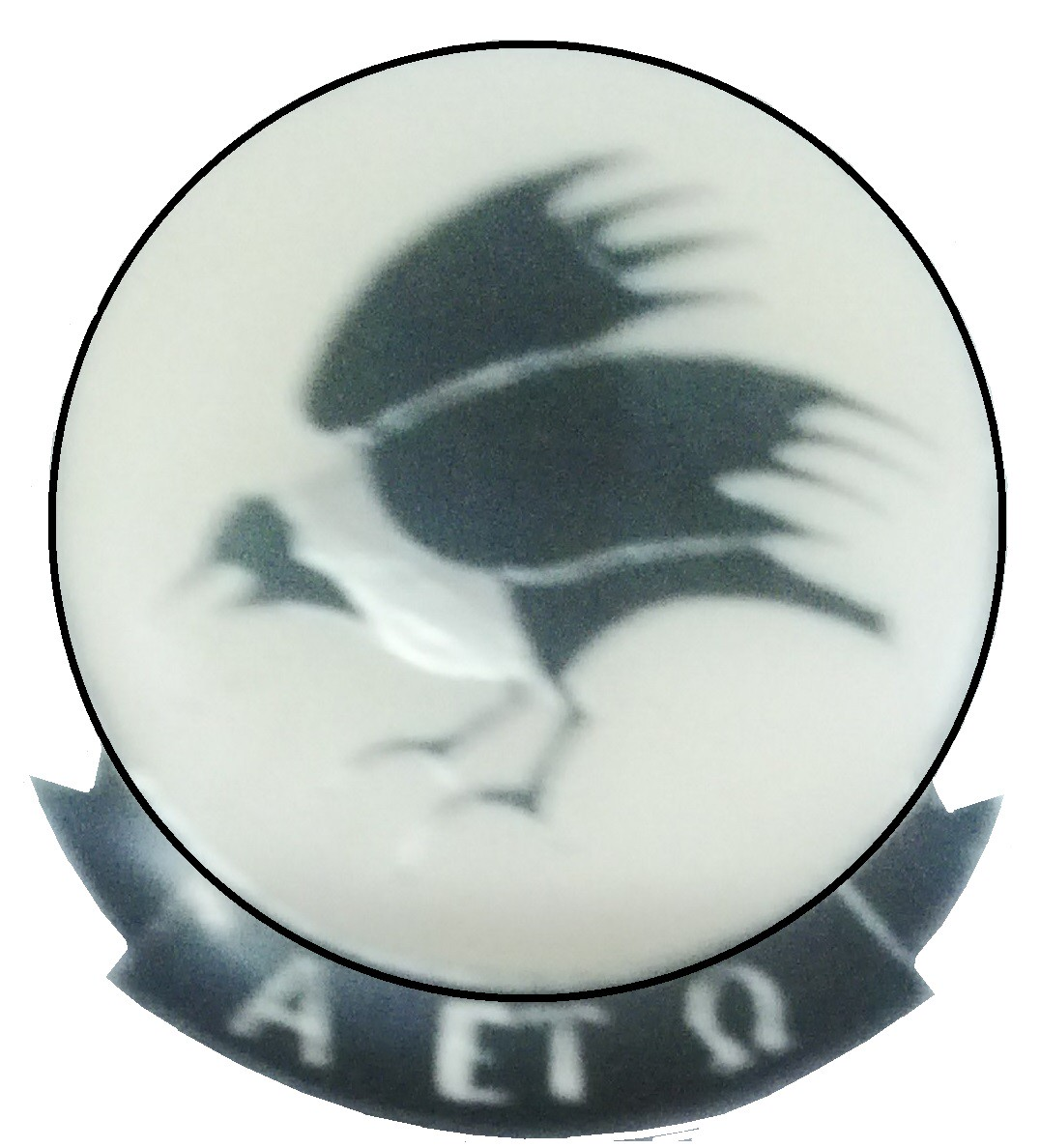
- SADF 31 Battalion beret badge

31 Battalion was a light infantry battalion in the South African Army and in later years became part of the SWATF. The battalion consisted of men recruited from the hunter-gatherer San people. It was later called 201 Battalion.

== History ==
=== Tribal origin ===
The majority of this unit stem from two San tribes, namely the Khwe and !Xun. The Baraquenas tribe came from Cuando-Cubango region of Angola and the Vasquelas tribe from the Southern regions of Angola and north-eastern South West Africa. 31 Battalion started out as Alpha Group in 1974. It was renamed 31 Battalion in 1975. 31 Battalion was initially headquartered at Alpha Base and later Omega Base. It was formed by Colonel Delville Linford.

The majority of San soldiers have their origins as members of the Portuguese Army during the Angolan War of Independence. They had been part of the Flechas, a unit of the Portuguese Special Forces. With the Popular Movement for the Liberation of Angola (MPLA) assuming power in Angola in November 1975, many joined the SADF.

=== Renaming ===
The South West Africa Territory Force SWATF renumbered battalion numbers according to their geographical positioning on the border. The prefix 10 pertained to battalions operating to the west of the Kavango River, 20 to the Kavango or central region and 70 to the eastern region. Under this system, 31 Battalion was renamed 201 Battalion in 1980.

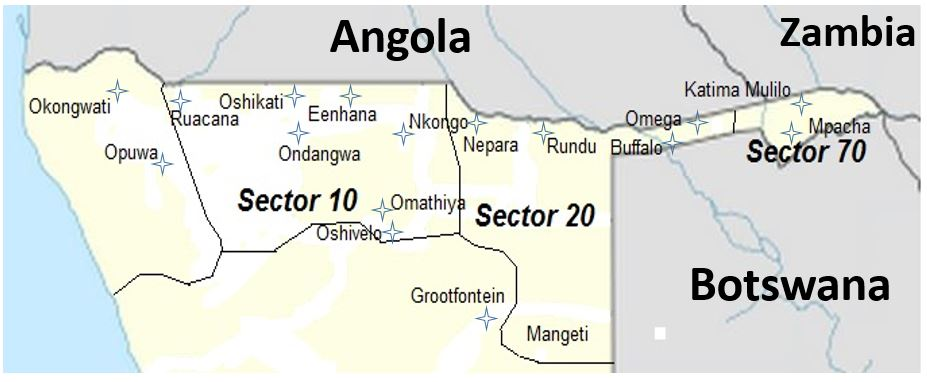
SWATF Northern Sector Map

=== Structure ===
By the late 1980s, 201 Battalion comprised:

- a HQ,
- Support Company,
- a Maintenance Workshop,
- 2 Operational Groups of 3 tracker companies (early 80's 2 companies) each with 3 Platoons, 6 teams, 25 – 30 men each with 3 Buffel APCs and,
- a Reconnaissance Wing, 6 Tracker Groups of 5 or 6 men.

=== Insignia ===
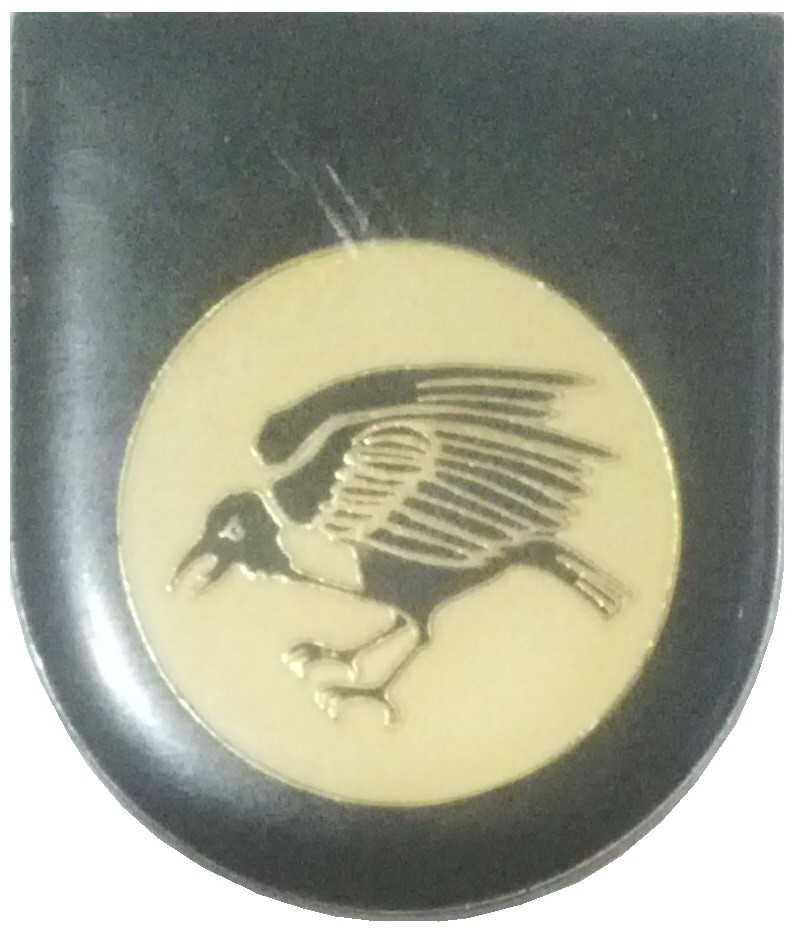
SWATF 201 Battalion pocket fob

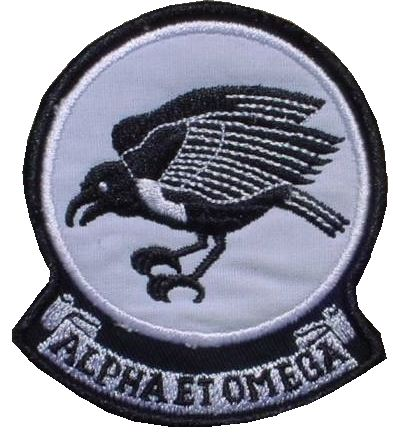
SWATF 201 Battalion patch badge

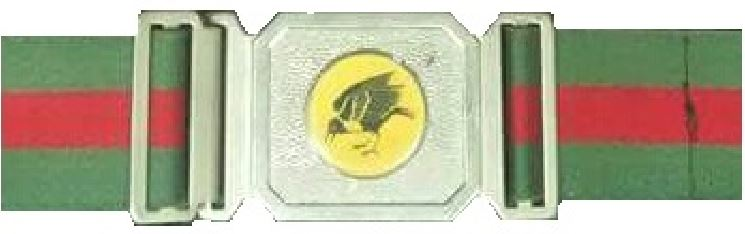
SWATF 201 Battalion stable belt

=== Tours ===
Two companies of 201 Battalion were always in the bush for six-week tours, while the remaining companies rested and retrained at Omega. After the bush tour, these companies returned to Omega and their place would be taken by the other half of the battalion. At least half of the battalion would be on operations at all times and the rotational schedule insured that fresh troops were in the bush hunting SWAPO at all times.

=== Operation Savannah ===
During Operation Savannah in Angola, members were deployed in a conventional role as Battle-Group Alpha, part of Task Force Zulu, and advanced approximately 2,000 kilometers in a month.

=== Specialization ===
Some of the San were trained as parachutists and served in the units reconnaissance wing behind enemy lines. Others were attached to various units as trackers and guides.

Similar to its historically closely related twin unit 32 Battalion, it was a permanently operational unit and had its own in-house reconnaissance wing

The recce wing was used primarily for surveillance or clandestine missions in its operational area. This involved dangerous behind-the-line incursions-such as in the bush looking for SWAPO bases or arm caches, or gathering information and intelligence on SWAPO units moving in the area. These operations required stealth, steady nerves, and well-trained, disciplined troops. To be successful, their presence would have to remain undetected by SWAPO or by SWAPO sympathizers.

=== Withdrawal of 31 Battalion to South Africa ===
The Battalion reverted to its 31 Battalion name in 1989 when it transferred back to the SADF.

UN Resolution 435 called on South Africa to reduce its forces in Namibia to 12,000 before the start of any peace process and finally to 1500 by 1989.

Several thousand San, fearing reprisal or intimidation, left for South Africa with the SADF.

The soldiers of 31 Battalion and their families were settled near Schmidtsdrif in the Northern Cape.

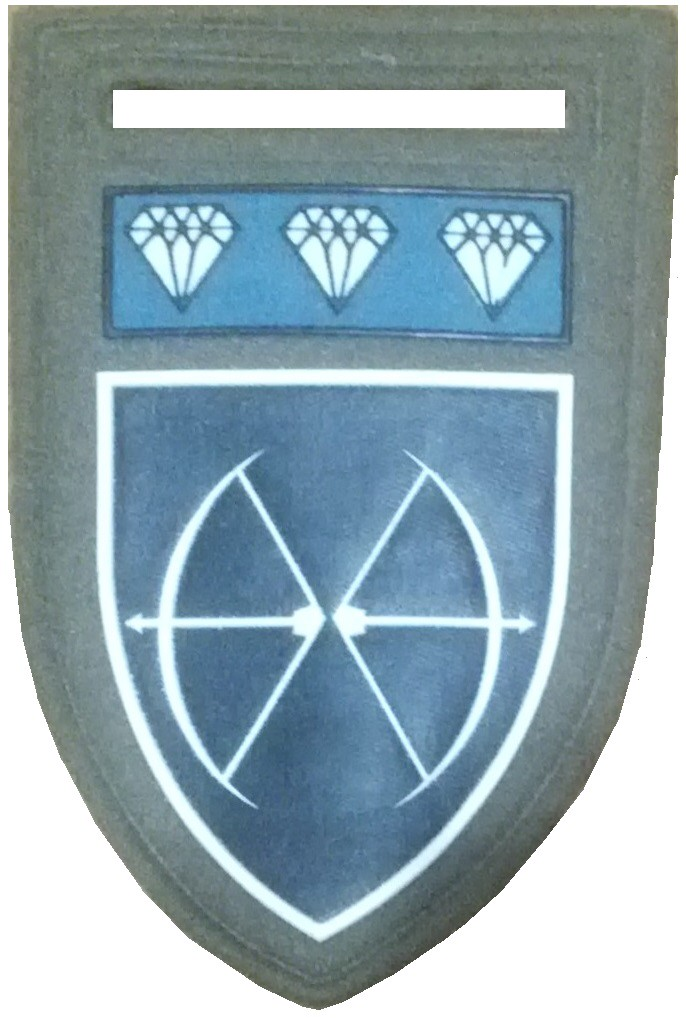
SADF 31 Battalion with Northern Cape Command Tupper Flash

=== Disbandment ===
Sunday, 7 March 1993, 31 Battalion was disbanded at a public ceremony in the Cape Province.

About 1000 soldiers were transferred to other units in the Northern Cape and would help patrol the Namibian border.

== Roll of Honour ==
- 1982: Andonio,F., Cpl
- 1991: Andrade,J., Rfn
- 1984: Arico,, Rfn
- 1991: Augusto,J., Rfn
- 1976: Bambo,J., Sgt
- 1977: Bango,M., Pte
- 1982: Bango,K., Rfn
- 1977: Bernado,A.D.B., Sgt
- 1977: Boma,J., Pte
- 1982: Catumbele,D., Rfn
- 1981: Chamba,M., Pte
- 1986: Chilunku,T., Rfn
- 1990: Chimongaia,C., L-Cpl
- 1977: Chuca,M., Pte
- 1982: Comoxoxo,K., Rfn
- 1979: Conga,J., Pte
- 1981: Dala,A., Pte
- 1981: Dala,A., Rfn
- 1984: Dala,J., Rfn
- 1984: Dala,L., Cpl
- 1984: Dala,L., Rfn
- 1977: Deacon,G.A., Cpl
- 1977: Desenga,, Pte
- 1985: Difransa,P., Rfn
- 1982: Dimbo,J., Rfn (Note: This person is marked on the Fort Klapperkop Memorial wall with an * as having died during operations or in combat.)
- 1977: Dindo,B., Pte
- 1980: Du Preez,I.P., 2Lt
- 1980: Du Preez,I.P., 2Lt
- 1988: Du Toit,P.G.V., L-Cpl
- 1981: Elefanti,, Pte
- 1987: Emmanuel,L., Rfn
- 1982: Francesco,L., Rfn
- 1985: Gobe,J., L-Cpl
- 1985: Gore,J., Cpl
- 1984: Jepau,R., Rfn
- 1990: Joaquim,J., Rfn
- 1992: Johannes,J., Rfn
- 1982: Kademba,P., Rfn
- 1977: Kambinda,M., Pte
- 1991: Kambinda,S., Rfn
- 1983: Kanheto,T., Sgt
- 1982: Kapango,P., Rfn
- 1982: Katibelo,D., Rfn
- 1992: Kavenga,K., Rfn
- 1977: Luciano,J., Pte
- 1991: Makuwe,E., Rfn
- 1982: Masonga,J, Rfn
- 1976: Matendi,A., Pte
- 1976: Matoko,P., Pte
- 1984: Matsetse,D., Cpl
- 1993: Mbangu,J., Rfn
- 1993: Mukelenge,M., Rfn
- 1982: Nando,, Rfn
- 1979: Njunge,D., Pte
- 1992: Pontes,T., Rfn
- 1992: Ponto,K., Rfn
- 1988: Prinsloo,A., Cpl
- 1983: Riem,, Rfn
- 1982: Rodriques,M., Rfn
- 1977: Ruaro,J., Pte
- 1977: Shorty,, Pte
- 1975: Teteko,R., Pte
- 1986: Tjenda,B., Rfn
- 1983: Van den Berg,J.G.J., Pte
- 1976: Van der Westhuizen,T.J., Lt
- 1982: Van Heerden,W.E., Rfn
- 1978: Van Rooyen,N.M.H.G.D.S., Pte
- 1982: Verwey,L., Rfn
- 1988: Wama,P., Rfn

201 Battalion

- 1985: Aupindi,D., Rfn
- 1981: Van Zyl,J., CO

== Leadership ==
Leadership
From	Honorary Colonel	To	Ribbon
	No known incumbents		
From	Officer Commanding	To	Ribbon
1974	Cmdt D. Linford	1977	
1977	Maj C.P. Upton	1978	
1978	Cmdt P.W. Hall	1980	
1980	Cmdt F.A. Botes	1982	
1982	Cmdt B.M. Adams	1986	
1986	Cmdt Johan Jooste (Note: Later Commanding Officer of 8 South African Infantry Battalion)	1986	
1986	Cmdt P.D. van der Merwe	1987	
1987	Cmdt C.J. Saunders	1989	
From	Regimental Sergeants Major	To	Ribbon
	No known incumbents		
