= Nooitgedacht Glacial Pavements =

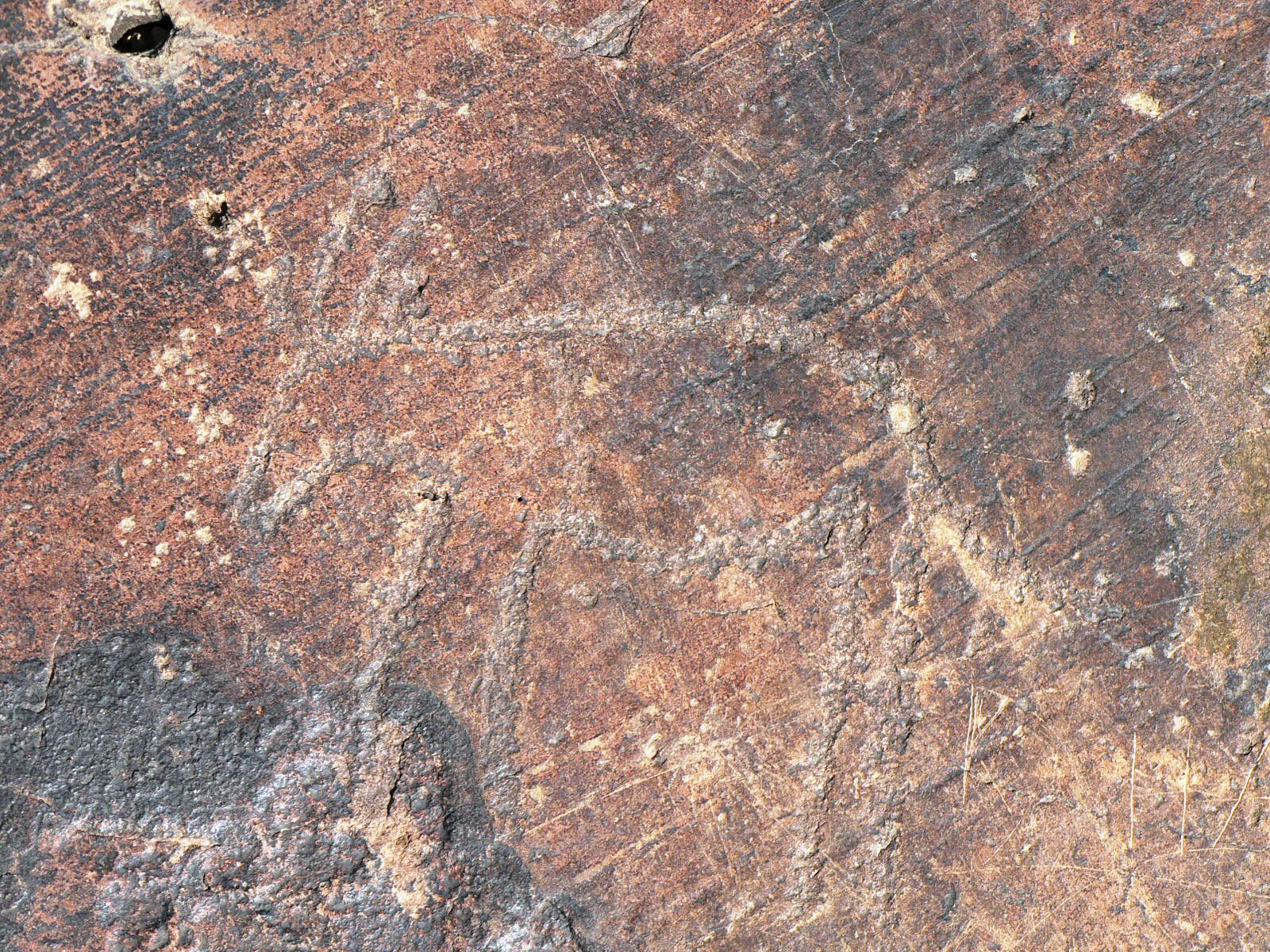
- Rock art on the Nooitgedacht Glacial Pavement
- 28°35′56.2956″S 24°36′41.6088″E
- Location: Barkly West, Northern Cape, South Africa
- Nooitgedacht Glacial Pavements (Northern Cape) Nooitgedacht Glacial Pavements (South Africa)

The Nooitgedacht Glacial Pavements comprise a geological feature between Kimberley and Barkly West, South Africa, pertaining to the Palaeozoic-age Dwyka Ice Age, or Karoo Ice Age, (some 300 million years ago) where the glacially scoured (smoothed and striated) ancient bedrock (re-exposed by erosion) was used, substantially more recently, during the Later Stone Age period in the late Holocene as panels for rock engravings.

== Ice Age ==
Some 300-290 million years ago, during Dwyka times, what is now Southern Africa was, as a result of plate tectonics, near the South Pole and large ice sheets or glaciers covered high-lying areas. Geologists term this upland the Cargonian Highlands, stretching from what is now the Northern Cape through Gauteng to Mpumalanga. As the Dwyka glaciers moved, grinding their way southwards, the rocks and rubble that became embedded in their belly smoothed the underlying Andesite rock pavements and scoured out scratch marks, known as striations. As the ice shaped the landscape, the continent of Gondwanaland continued to drift slowly northwards, ultimately bringing this area into warmer latitudes. As the glaciers melted, a mixture of clay and rock was left behind which eventually consolidated into a rock called Tillite – the lower-most layer in the Karoo sequence. Quite large erratics or drop stones carried here by glacial action are found at Nooitgedacht. The changing local environment also created conditions conducive for the burgeoning of life, reflected in the rich fossil record of the Karoo.

== River of diamonds ==
Along this portion of its course, the adjacent Vaal River, and earlier generations of rivers and erosion processes, have cut through and swept away a vast mass of Karoo rock and sediment, to re-expose the volcanic Andesite landscape formed 2.7 billion years ago and shaped by glacial action 300 million years ago. At one time – when the diamondiferous pipes penetrated to the surface between 120 and 90 million years ago – it is estimated that about 1 km of Karoo sediment overlay the Kimberley-Barkly West area. Diamonds were eroded out of these pipes and caught in pockets of sediment and gravels which, once discovered, changed the course of modern South African history.

Since 1869, the various gravels along the Vaal River have been worked intensively for their content of high-grade alluvial diamonds. The Nooitgedacht diggings were opened in 1949 and closed in 1981. During these 32 years, a total of 80 000 diamonds were found here. The Venter Diamond, a 511-carat (102.2 g) yellow stone, was the largest.

The standard size of a digger's claim was 15 x 15 metres. The diamond-bearing gravels, covered by a layer of sterile red sand, were washed by hand in simple rotary pans. The left-over concentrate of heavy material was then carefully sorted for diamonds.

The search for diamonds continues along the Vaal River in the Windsorton, Barkly West and Delportshoop areas and further downstream.

Diggings on Nooitgedacht itself were opened again in the late 1990s.

Some small-scale diggers in the region still use pick and shovel to eke out a meagre return, but miners using heavy earth-moving equipment obtain far better results. The impacts of this on the environment and on heritage resources are not small.

== Rock Art ==
The images found on the andesite glacial pavements at Nooitgedacht are a form of rock art called rock engravings (the term petroglyph is also sometimes used). They were produced by pecking out the outlines or silhouettes of animals, or ‘geometric’ designs, with a pointed stone (there is no evidence that the artists used metal tools, nor indeed diamonds). They were made by ancestors of San and Khoe people, probably during the past 1500 years. The engravings include depictions of humans, eland, rhinoceros, ostrich, giraffe and anteater. The more abstract forms may depict bags and aprons, as well as ‘geometric’ images such as are common at other sites in the region, particularly Driekops Eiland.

What these different images mean is subject to debate. One argument suggests that whereas sites such as the nearby Wildebeest Kuil, with its profusion of engravings of animals and some human figures, is quintessentially San/hunter-gatherer in character, sites such as Nooitgedacht and Driekops Eiland, where geometric engravings occur in great numbers, may belong to a different tradition of rock art, a separate Khoekhoe herder rock art tradition. A different perspective does not discount this possibility, but questions whether assigning variability in terms of ethnic or cultural differences in the first instance does not overlook other possible factors.

Research at Driekops Eiland suggests that sites such as this, and the ‘geometric’ engravings, bags and aprons present, may have been produced as part of girls’ coming-of-age rites, potentially across the spectrum of both San and Khoekhoe contexts, given the similarities in beliefs and ritual practices.

== Diamond Fields Land Dispute ==
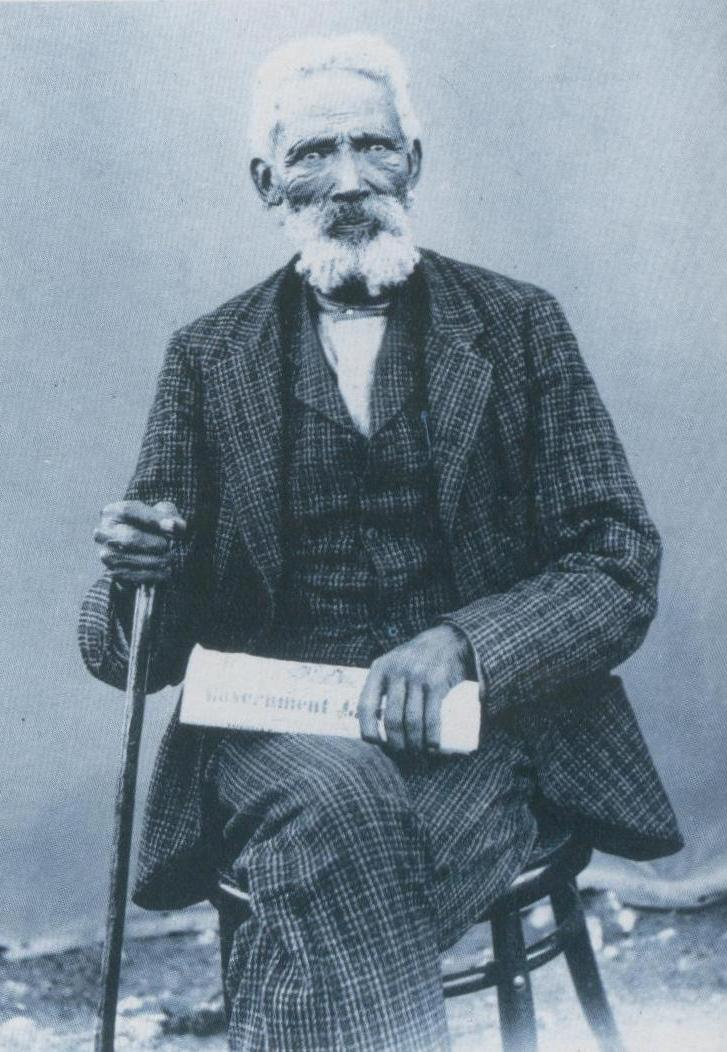
Griqua leader and Captain, Nicolaas Waterboer

Various claims and counter claims to ownership of this territory were made following the discovery of diamonds in 1869-70. Nooitgedacht featured early on, when the Presidents of the Free State and Transvaal Republics met here with the Griqua Chief Nicolaas Waterboer and his agent David Arnot, on 18 August 1870.

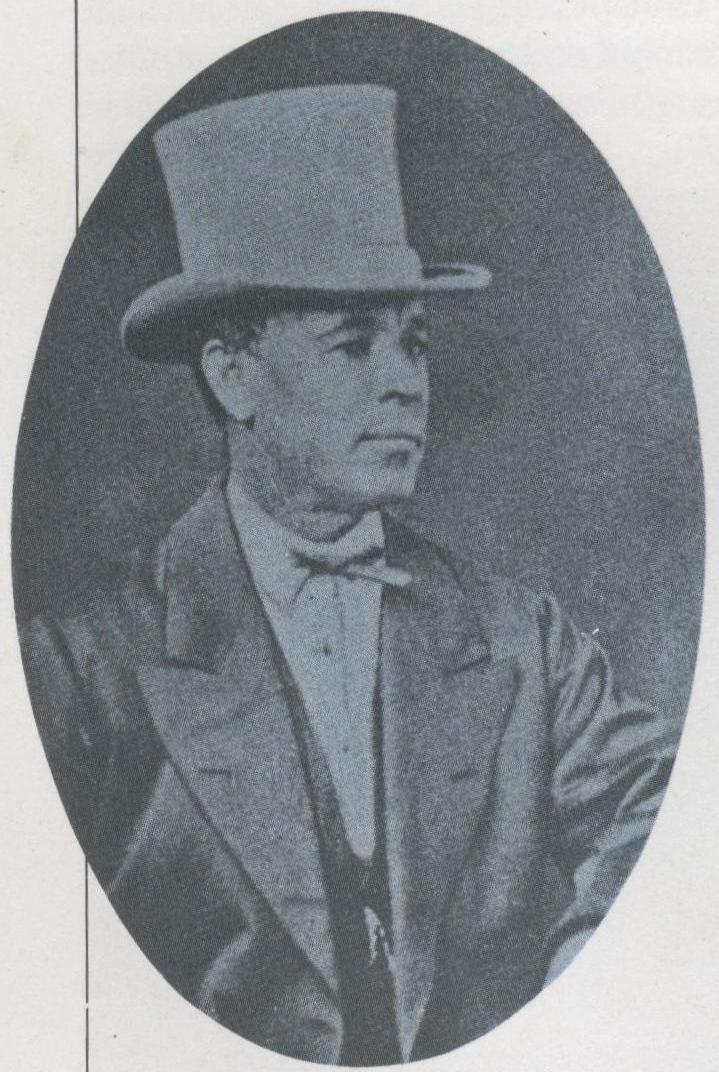
David Arnot, Griqua lawyer and diplomat

The Griqua representatives walked out in a huff and the Free State proclaimed the territory theirs. But this was not the end of the story, the dispute being settled eventually by the Keate Award (in favour of Waterboer, who placed himself under British protection), and the proclamation of the Crown Colony of Griqualand West on 27 October 1871.

== Preservation as Heritage Site ==
The site was declared a National Monument in 1936 and under South Africa's Act 25 of 1999 is now a Grade 2 Provincial Heritage Site.
