= Schmidtsdrift =

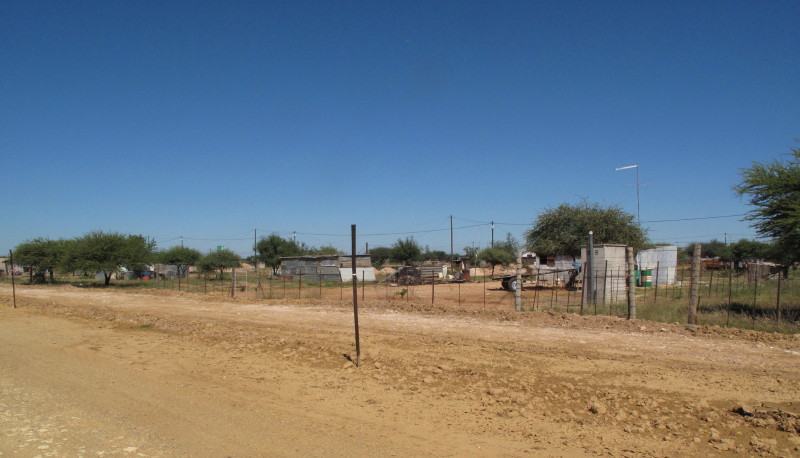
- Schmidtsdrif

- Location within Northern Cape Location within South Africa
- Coordinates: 28°42′0″S 24°3′29″E
- Country: South Africa
- Province: Northern Cape
- District: Pixley ka Seme
- Municipality: Siyancuma

Area
  - Total: 2.39 km^{2} (0.92 sq mi)

Population (2011)
  - Total: 1,163
  - Density: 487/km^{2} (1,260/sq mi)

Racial makeup (2011)
  - Black African: 89.1%
  - Coloured: 9.5%
  - Indian/Asian: 0.8%
  - Other: 0.7%

First languages (2011)
  - Tswana: 69.2%
  - Afrikaans: 22.9%
  - S. Ndebele: 2.2%
  - English: 1.9%
  - Other: 3.8%
- Time zone: UTC+2 (SAST)
- Area code: 053

Schmidtsdrift is a town in Pixley ka Seme District Municipality in the Northern Cape province of South Africa. Situated 80 km west of Kimberley, it was originally a ford across the Vaal River which is now bridged on the N8 National Route from Kimberley to Campbell and Griquatown.

The history of Schmidtsdrift has been traced back to 1827 when it was declared Crown Trust Land, occupied by the Tswana-speaking Batlhaping and Griqua people. It was scheduled as the Schmidtsdrift Native Reserve in terms of the 1913 Natives Land Act. The threat of relocation in the 1950s forced some of the Griqua families to identify as Batlhaping, becoming known as the Kleinfonteintjie community. The Griqua families who did not align themselves with the Batlhaping were forcibly removed, subsequently. Ultimately the ‘black spot’ removal policy saw more than 1000 Tswana (Batlhaping) households removed in 1968, forced onto military trucks at gunpoint.

The former Schmidtsdrift farms continued to be state land. The South African Defence Force (SADF) Infantry Battalion acquired use of it in 1974, establishing a military training base.

After Namibia's independence in 1990 members of the 31 Battalion (the so-called Bushman Battalion) consisting of ǃKung (also known as Vasekele) and Khwe (known also as Mbarakwengo), were settled in a tent town near to Schmidtsdrift. They had been recruited by the South African Army in northern Namibia to fight against SWAPO. In 2003, most of the !Kung and Khwe community relocated to Platfontein outside Kimberley following the successful landclaim on Schmidtsdrift by the erstwhile Batlhaping inhabitants.

The town hosts an eponymous diamond mine, 80% owned by Lonrho Mining and 20% by the Schmidtsdrift Communal Property Association. In June 2008 an 18.39 carat diamond was discovered at the mine.

== See also ==
- Pomfret, North West, a town which similarly hosts a large population of South African Army veterans
