= Mokala National Park =

Protected area in the Northern Cape, South Africa

- IUCN category II (national park)
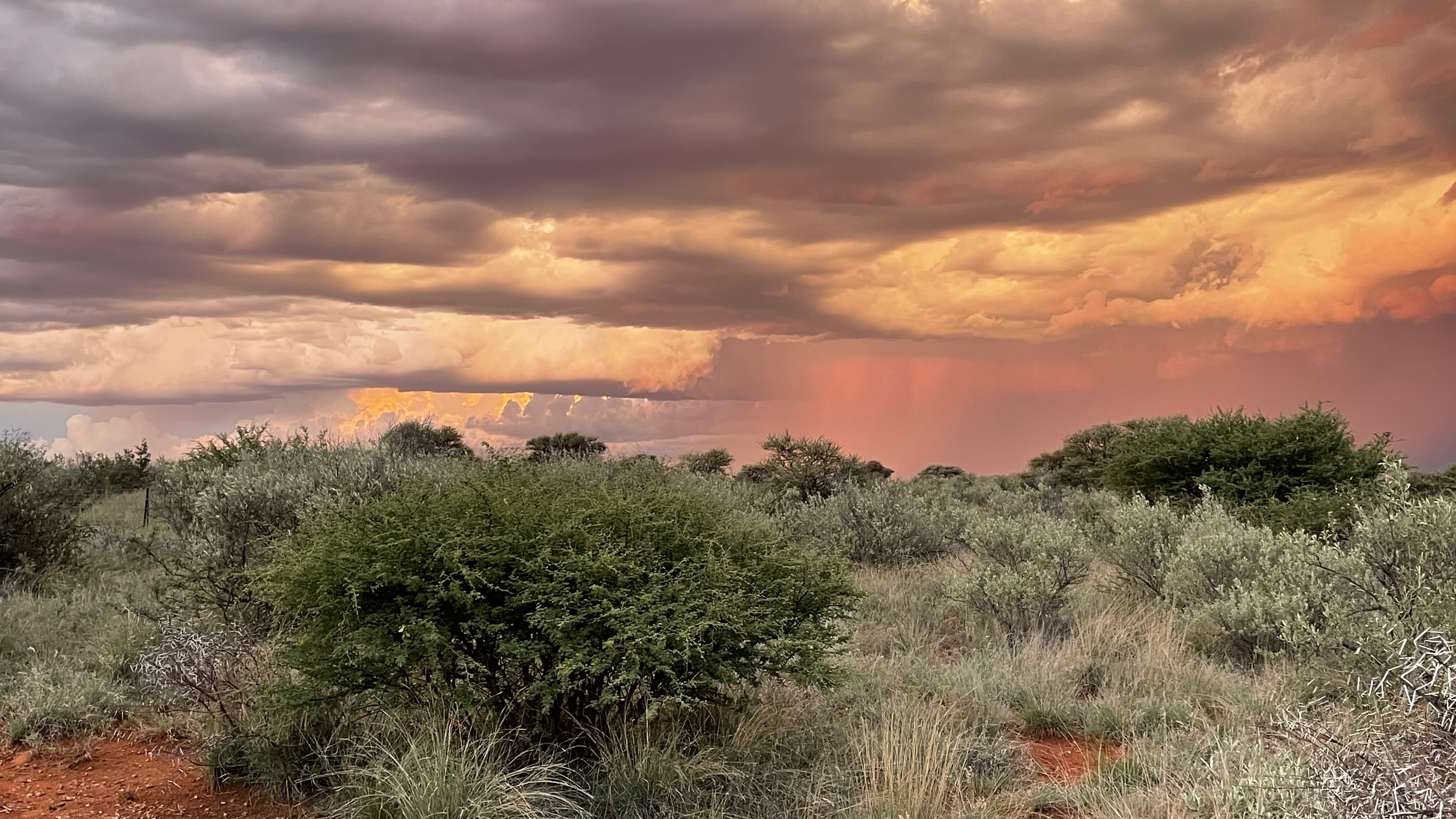
- Location of the park
- Location: Northern Cape, South Africa
- Nearest city: Kimberley
- Coordinates: 29°10′S 24°21′E
- Area: 196.11 km^{2} (75.72 sq mi)
- Established: 19 June 2007; 19 years ago
- Governing body: South African National Parks
- Website: www.sanparks.org/parks/mokala/
- Mokala National Park (South Africa)

Mokala National Park is a reserve established in the Plooysburg area south-west of Kimberley in the Northern Cape, South Africa on 19 June 2007. The size of the park is 26,485 hectares. Mokala is the Setswana name for the magnificent camel thorn, a tree species typical of the arid western interior and common in the area. There is currently 70 km of accessible roads in the national park.

== History ==
The new park effectively replaces the Vaalbos National Park 28°34′S 24°18′E, which was deproclaimed to comply with land claims and diamond prospecting rights. In 1998, SANParks undertook a study of five areas to determine the best replacement locations. A 19 611 hectare tract of land, Wintershoek, was subsequently selected. In 2005, the land was purchased and plans for the re-introduction of game were formed. The first five animals, a group of giraffes, were released into the reserve in June 2006, and a year later it was officially proclaimed.

The cultural diversity of the area consist of many San rock engravings and Second Boer War battlefields, including the nearby battlefield of Belmont.

== Climate ==
The Northern Cape is a dry region with fluctuating temperatures and differing topographies. The weather is typically that of desert and semi-desert areas. The annual rainfall is never high (between 300–500 mm, average 400 mm) and is always lower than the rate of evaporation. Summers (from December to February) are hot with temperatures usually between 33 °C and 36 °C. Although not common, summer temperatures in the Northern Cape can exceed 40 °C. During the summer months, the rainy season thunderstorms occurs in the central and eastern areas and is often accompanied by heavy thunderstorms, whereas winter rainfall occur mainly in the western region. During winter (June to August), day temperatures are generally mild to warm (22 °C), but at night it can be cold, often below 0 °C.

== Landscape ==
This region is the transition zone of the savanna (Kalahari and Nama Karoo) biomes; the former being flat and sandy dotted with camel thorns, umbrella thorns, puzzle bushes and haystack-like sociable weaver nests constructed in the larger trees, and the latter characterised by rocky lava outcrops, calcrete and shales. The southern region of the park, closest to the entrance gate, is more plains-like, with isolated camel thorns and tall grasses. The central regions of the park consist of the Karoo-like habitats, with long rows of rocky outcrops interspersed with flat areas of grass and scrub. The base and lower slopes of the outcrops receive extra run-off and are better vegetated.

== Wildlife ==
This park is home to a number of endangered species and the main purpose of the park is to protect these species. Cape buffalo, black rhino and roan antelope are to be found, besides a range of smaller species. There are mosquitoes during summer, but it is a malaria-free zone.

The list of mammal species is not inclusive but rather shows the most common or special ones

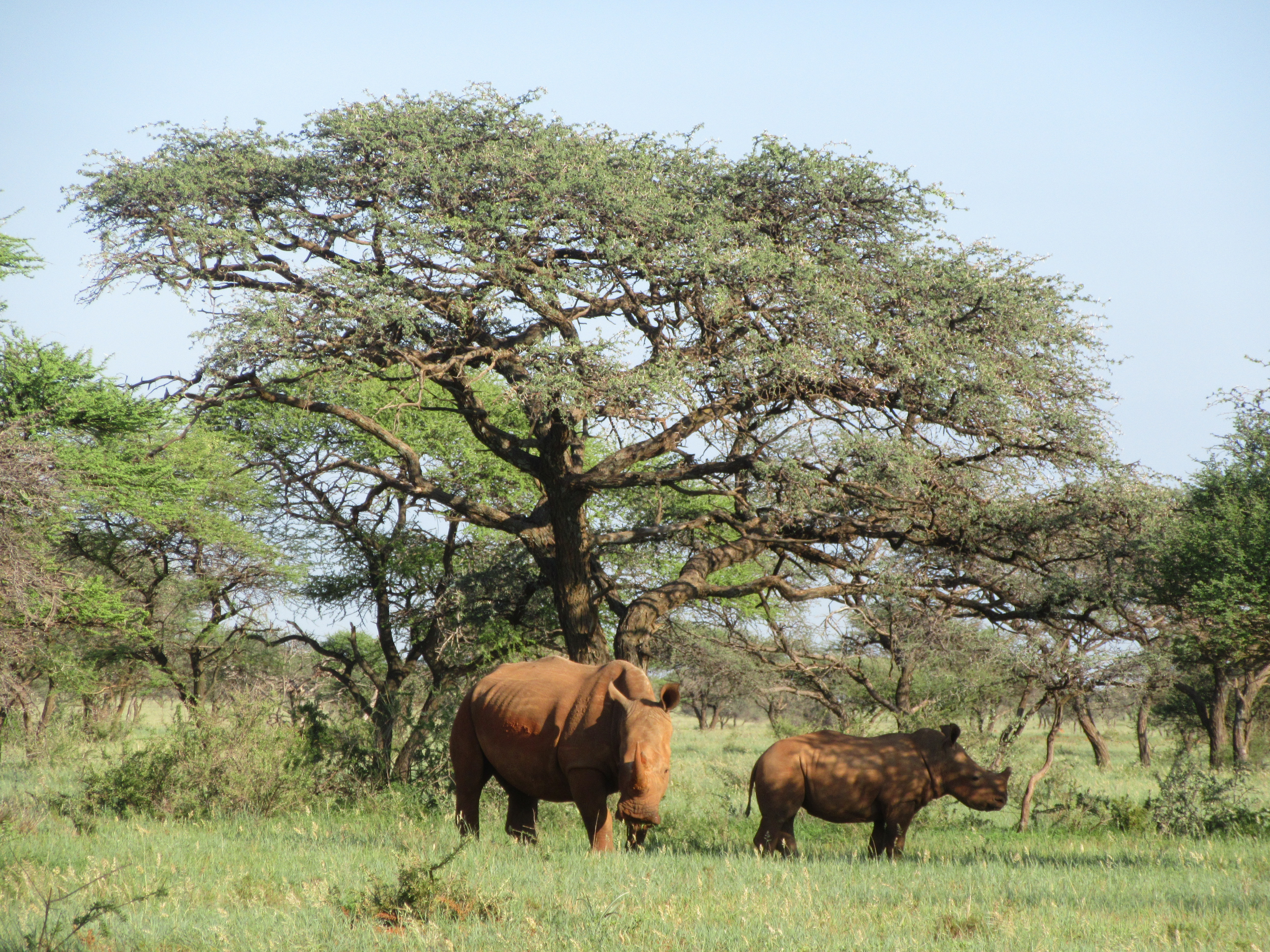
White rhinos with Camelthorn trees in the background.

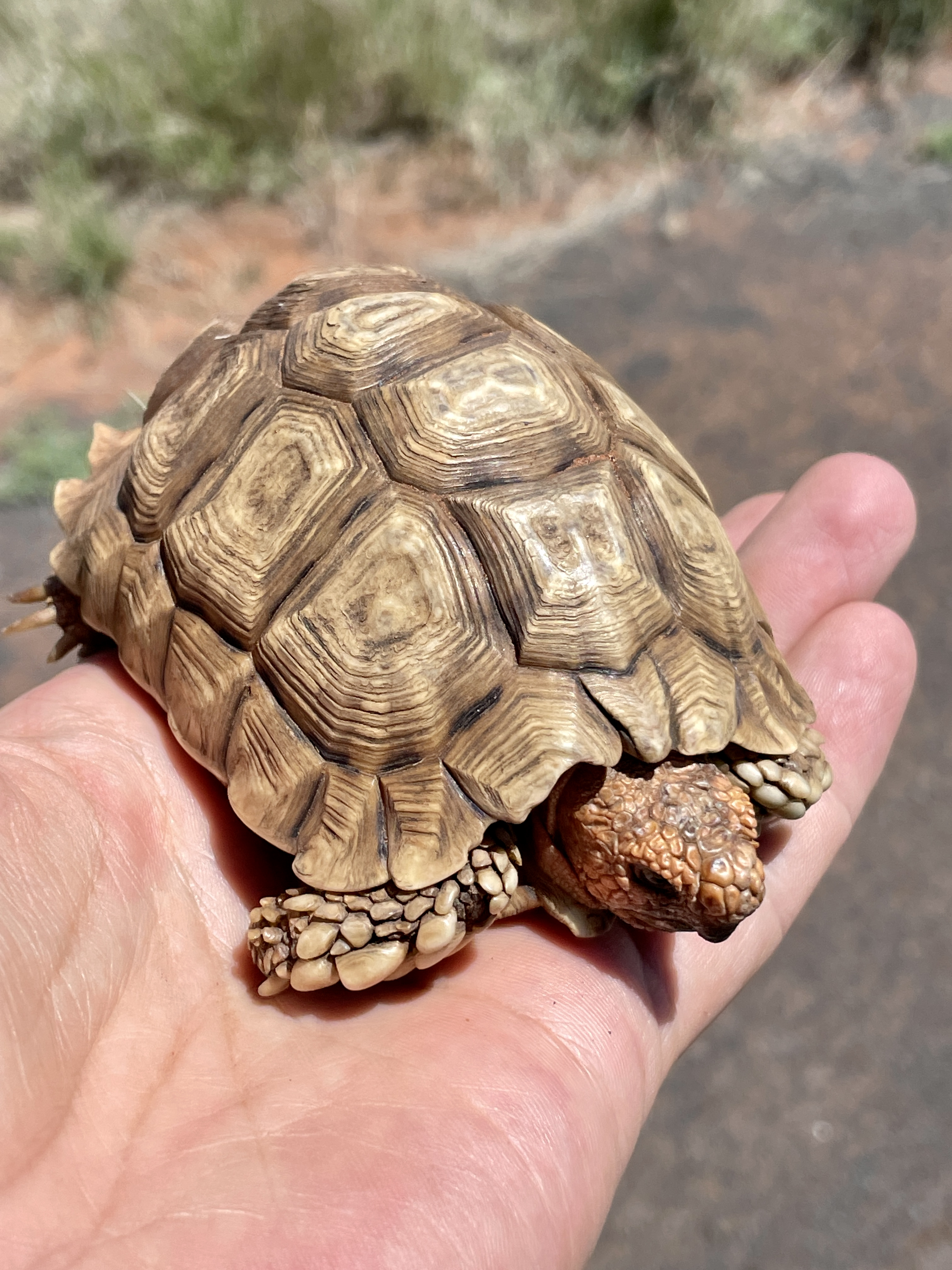
Psammobates oculiferus

List of mammals in the reserve
- Aardvark (Orycteropus afer)
- Black-backed jackal (Canis mesomelas)
- Black wildebeest (Connochaetes gnou)
- Blue wildebeest (Connochaetes taurinus)
- Common warthog (Phacochoerus africanus)
- Eland (Taurotragus oryx)
- Gemsbok (Oryx gazella)
- Giraffe (Giraffa camelopardalis giraffa)
- Impala (Aepyceros melampus)
- Kudu (Tragelaphus strepsiceros)
- Mountain reedbuck (Redunca fulvorufula)
- Plains zebra (Equus quagga)
- Red hartebeest (Alcelaphus buselaphus caama)
- Roan antelope (Hippotragus equinus)
- Southern African ground squirrel (Xerus inauris)
- Southern African hedgehog (Atelerix frontalis)
- Smith's red rock rabbit (Pronolagus rupestris)
- Sable antelope (Hippotragus niger)
- Brown hyena (Parahyaena brunnea)
- Southern white rhinoceros (Ceratotherium simum simum)
- Springbok (Antidorcas marsupialis)
- Suricate (Suricata suricatta)
- Tsessebe (Damaliscus lunatus lunatus)

== Birding ==
A bird list is available at reception. In summer, the best time to go birding in Mokala National Park is at sunrise, particularly between 07h30 and 09h00. The level of endemism at Mokala is high. The Kalahari sandveld habitats hold more bird species than the rocky areas, especially during times of higher rainfall. The endemic black-chested prinia thrives in the arid conditions of the park. Chestnut-vented warblers are attracted to the lawns surrounding the lodges. A fairly tame pair of Cape buntings frequent Mosu Lodge, using the buildings as an artificial nest structure, while greater striped swallows nest beneath the eaves of the restaurant's thatched roof.

The list of bird species is not inclusive but rather shows the most common or special ones

List of birds in the reserve
- Ashy tit
- Cape penduline-tit
- Southern fiscal
- Crimson-breasted shrike
- Familiar chat
- Fawn-coloured lark
- Fiscal flycatcher
- Fork-tailed drongo
- Grey-backed cisticola
- Kalahari scrub-robin
- Karoo scrub-robin
- Lark-like bunting
- Marico flycatcher
- Mountain wheatear
- Northern black korhaan
- Orange River white-eye
- Pririt batis
- Red-headed finch
- Rufous-eared warbler
- Sabota lark
- Scaly-feathered finch
- Short-toed rock-thrush
- Sociable weaver
- Ant-eating chat
- White-backed vulture
- White-rumped swift
- Yellow-bellied eremomela
- Yellow canary

== Flora ==
=== Trees ===
- Vachellia erioloba (camel thorn, kameeldoring in Afrikaans),
- Vachellia tortilis (haak-en-steek in Afrikaans),
- Senegalia mellifera (blackthorn, swarthaak in Afrikaans),
- Ziziphus mucronata (buffalo thorn, blinkblaar-wag-'n-bietjie in Afrikaans).

=== Grasses ===
- Schmidtia pappophoroides
- Eragrostis lehmanniana
- Cynodon dactylon

== Accommodation ==
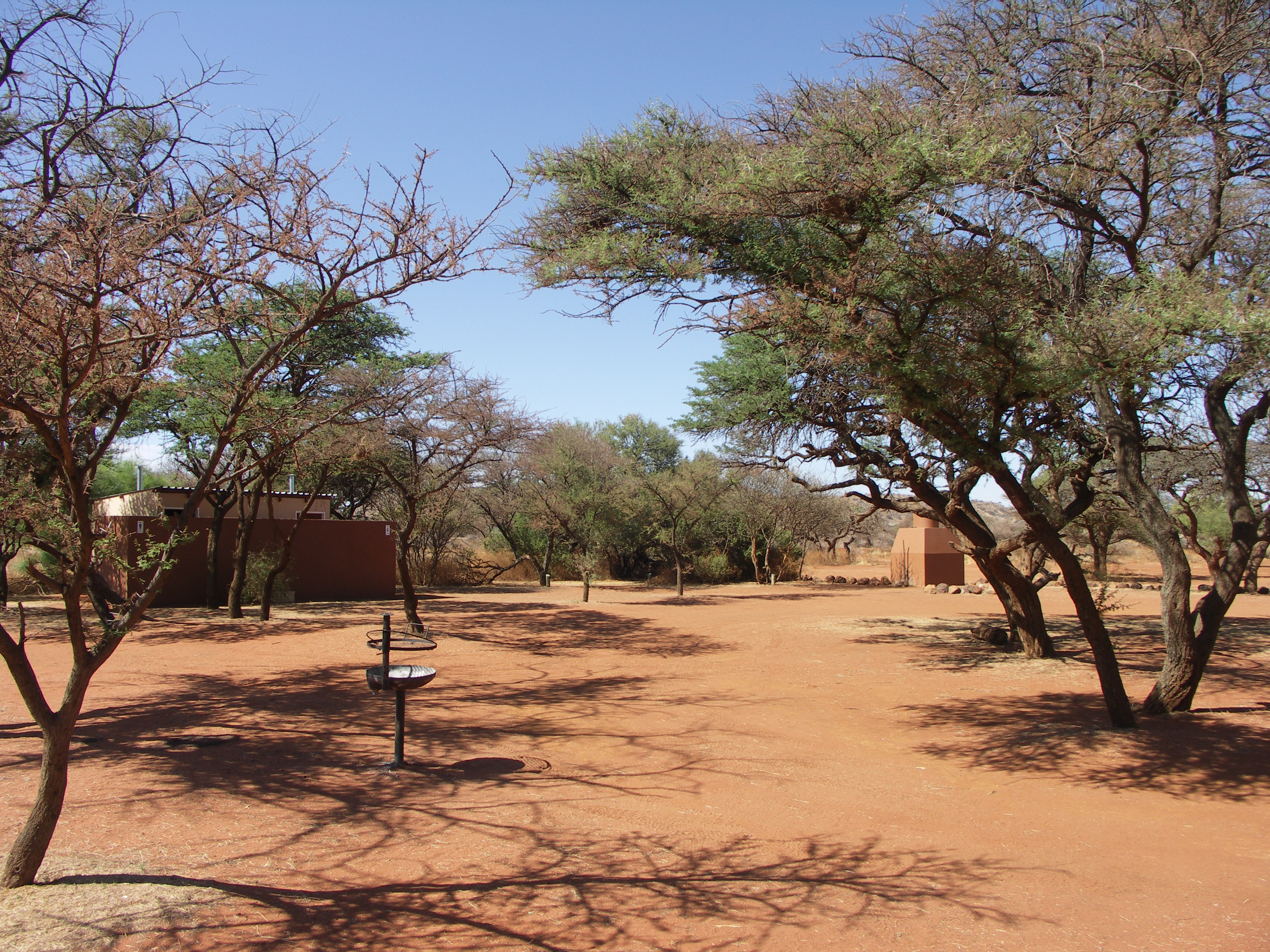
Haak-en-Steek camp site

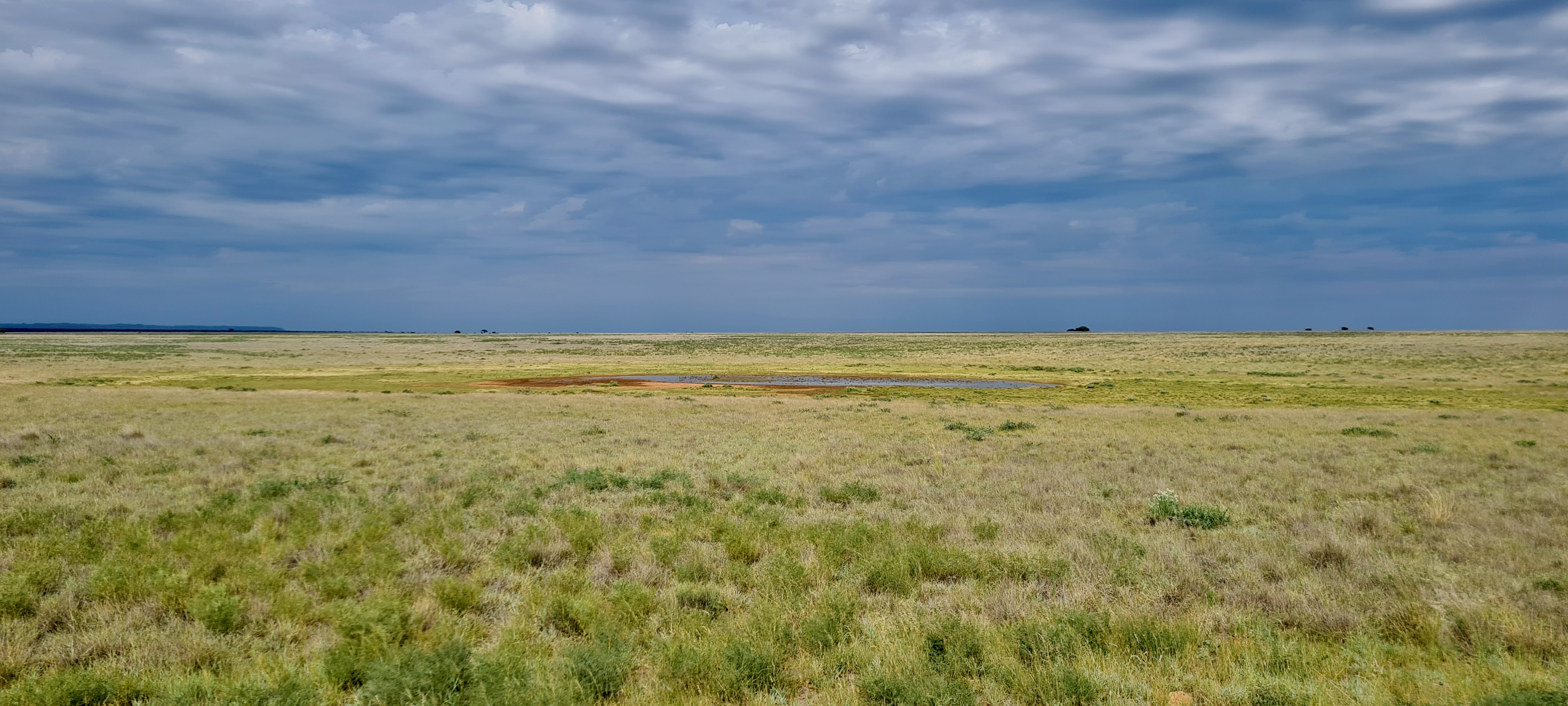
Lilydale waterhole

Accommodation can be found at one of three lodges, Mosu, Haak-en-Steek and Lilydale. Mosu Lodge overlooks a waterhole, which is intended to be a gathering place for game and birds.

Besides the lodges, visitors can also stay at Stofdam Bird hide, Kameeldoorn Tree House and the rustic Motswedi camping site, utilising their own camping gear. Sites at Motswedi each offer a private toilet, shower (solar geyser) and a built-in breakfast nook overlooking the waterhole. No power points are available here.

Two restaurants are situated at Mosu Lodge and Lilydale; meals at both need to be pre-booked at reception and Lilydale only serves breakfast and lunch. Self-catering wilderness camps and luxury private camp sites are planned for the future.

== How to get there ==
The park is at this point not well signposted, but from Kimberley is reached via the Hopetown road (N12), after 57 km right at the Hayfield/Heuningneskloof crossing (estimated time from Kimberley to Mokala 90 minutes). From Cape Town's direction, follow the N12 north past Hopetown, and turn left after 65 km at the crossing. After 21 km of gravel road, the gate of Mokala National Park is on the right hand side. Access through the main entrance is arranged by intercom, as the gate is remotely controlled from the main office.

== Gallery ==
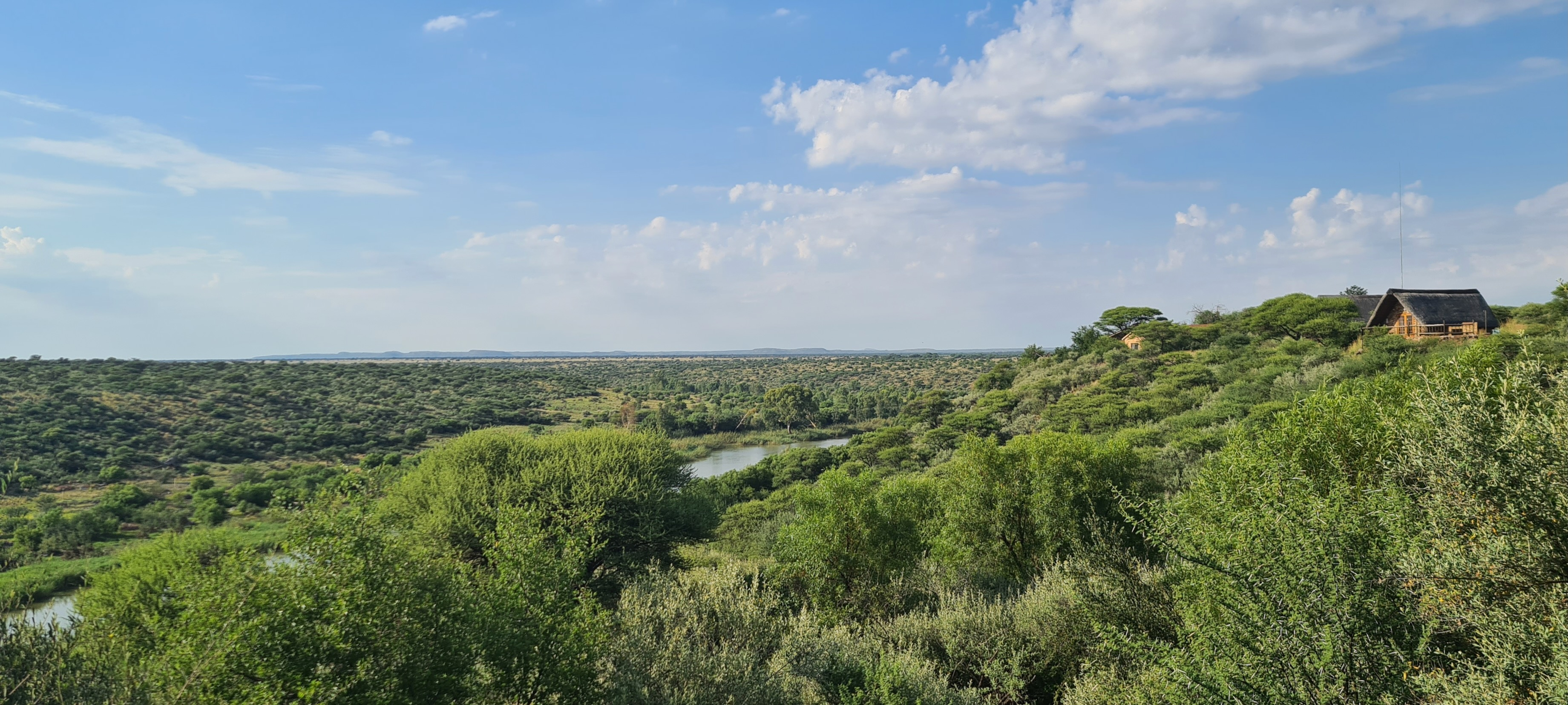
The Riet River flows at the eastern edge of the park at the Lilydale Lodge.

Video of a herd of gemsboks in Mokala National Park

Video of a sable antelope in Mokala National Park

== See also ==
- Kgalagadi Transfrontier Park
