= George William Stow =

South African geologist

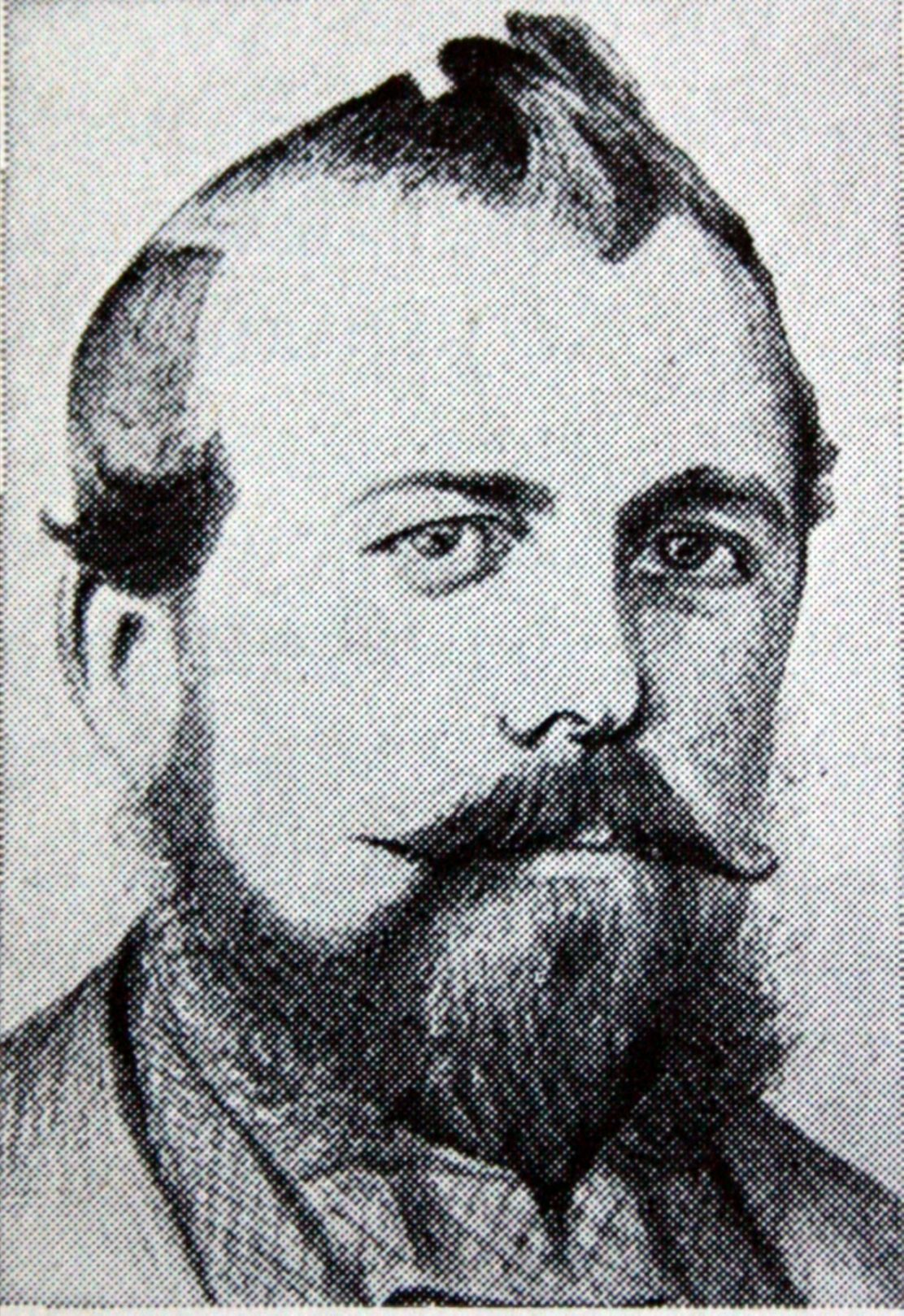
- George William Stow
- Born: 2 February 1822; Nuneaton, Warwickshire, England
- Died: 17 March 1882 (aged 60); Heilbron, Orange Free State
- Known for: poet, historian, artist, cartographer and writer
- Scientific career
- Fields: Geologist and Ethnologist

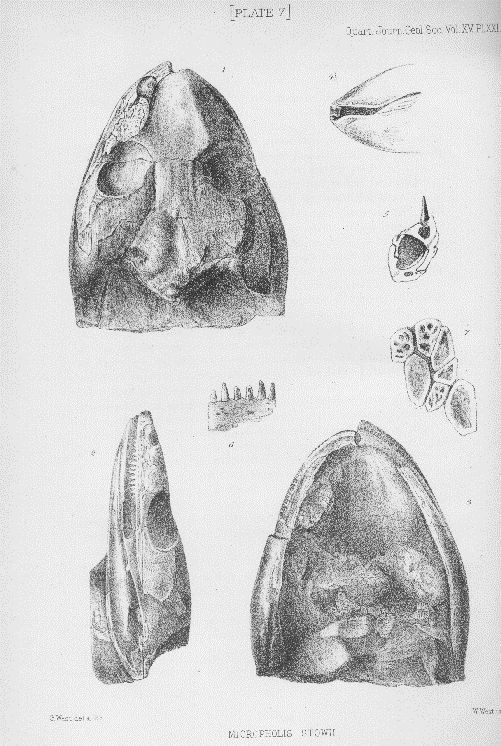
Micropholis stowi, Quarterly Journal of the Geological Society

George William Stow (2 February 1822, Nuneaton, Warwickshire, England – 17 March 1882, Heilbron, Orange Free State) was a geologist and ethnologist, a poet, historian, artist, cartographer, and writer.

== Biography ==
Stow received his education at a school on the Isle of Dogs. He was articled to a Dr. Lattey of London and was intended to follow a medical career. At age 21, having little desire to become a member of the medical profession, he emigrated to South Africa, landing at Port Elizabeth in December 1843. In turn he taught at a mission near Cuylerville, was a clerk in the commissariat, tried his hand at farming, became a book-keeper in Port Elizabeth, a trader in Queenstown and a wine-merchant, diamond dealer and auctioneer in Kimberley.

Seeking refuge in the Renosterberg range near Middelburg during the Eighth Frontier War, he found an Early Triassic fossil skull resembling an amphibian. Thereafter Stow spent a great deal of his time exploring the Cretaceous deposits within the Sundays and Zwartkops basins near Port Elizabeth and the Karroo System near Dordrecht. After the war Stow was persuaded by Dr. Richard Nathaniel Rubidge to report his discoveries to Thomas Rupert Jones of The Geological Society. At a meeting of The Geological Society on 17 November 1858, a paper by Stow "On Some Fossils from South Africa" was read. The species was later named Micropholis stowi by Huxley, and is currently placed in the family Amphibamidae. The paper was the first of many contributions by Stow to geological journals, the most important probably being "Geological Notes on Griqualand West" published in the Quarterly Journal of 1874, shortly after he was elected a Fellow of the Geological Society of London in 1872. His landmark work on the geology of Griqualand West was never published.

In the early 1870s Stow had set himself up as a wholesale wine merchant in Kimberley, a business that many found more profitable than digging for diamonds. However, geology was his first love and when he heard in 1872 that the Cape Colony Governor, Sir Henry Barkly, needed a geographical report on Griqualand West, he immediately put forward his name. His offer was accepted and a fee of £50 was agreed on. Sir Henry Barkly took Stow's maps and manuscript to England with him in 1877 where they were highly commended by both Sir Andrew Ramsay and Thomas Rupert Jones, but were never published, to the great detriment of South African geology. The documents were eventually returned and are preserved by the Geological Society of South Africa. In 1877 the Orange Free State commissioned him to do a geological survey.

While doing his field work Stow became familiar with rock art in the caves and shelters of South Africa. From the 1860s onward he recorded the rock art he encountered, and, in a letter to Thomas Rupert Jones, wrote:

"During the last three years I have been making pilgrimages to the various old Bushman caves among the mountains in this part of the Colony and Kaffraria; and, as their paintings are becoming obliterated very fast, it struck me that it would be well to make copies of them before these interesting relics of an almost extinct race are entirely destroyed."

Stow was a competent water-colour painter and 74 of his paintings were reproduced in "Rock Paintings in South Africa from Parts of the Eastern Province and Orange Free State" with an introduction and notes by the noted anthropologist Dorothea F. Bleek, daughter of renowned German linguist Dr Wilhelm Heinrich Immanuel Bleek. In 1944 she donated to the McGregor Museum a number of watercolours and rubbings of rock engravings in her possession and produced by Stow when on the Diamond Fields in the 1870s. In a letter dated June 1877 to Dorothea Bleek's aunt, Lucy Lloyd, Stow confided his plan to continue documenting rock art with the help of his young Bushman assistant. Despite a lack of funding, Stow persisted in recording rock art for posterity.

Throughout his trips over South Africa, Stow recorded information on tribes with which he came in contact, leading him to believe that the San or Bushmen were the ancient inhabitants of the region and the Bantu peoples relative newcomers. His book "The Native Races of South Africa" published in 1905 was edited and indexed by George McCall Theal, and was then the definitive work on the subject. He also wrote manuscripts on individual tribes, and these were later discovered at Smithfield by his biographer, Prof. Robert Burns Young, Head of the Geology Department at Witwatersrand University and a colleague of Raymond Dart.

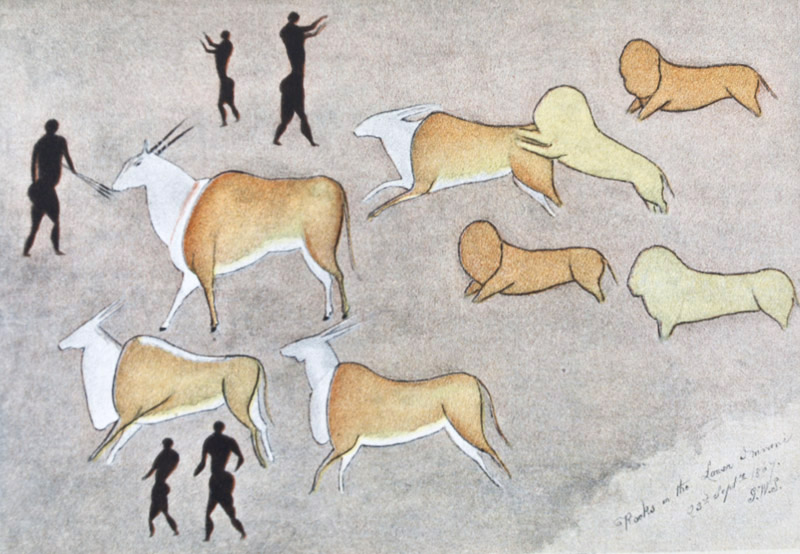
Bushman paintings on "Rocks in the Lower Mnweni 23 September 1867 G.W.S."

From 1880 Stow tried unsuccessfully to find a publisher for his Native Races of South Africa, eventually published in 1905 long after his death. He died in 1882 of heart failure in Heilbron in the Orange Free State.

Stow produced three volumes of verse –

- Thoughts on Britain and her destiny (1861)
- Lines on contemplation (1861)
- War: an ode (1867)

== Marriage ==
His first wife was Caroline Elizabeth Skinner whom he married in 1844 – their two children died in infancy and she in 1867. The following year he married Frances Sophia, daughter of Rev. John Heaviside, and she died in childbirth together with her infant in the same year. In 1869 he married Fanny Lewisa Russel de Smidt, who produced six daughters and survived him.

== Published books ==
- "The Native Races of South Africa: A History of the Intrusion of the Hottentots and Bantu into the Hunting Grounds of the Bushmen, the Aborigines of the Country" – McCall Theal, George (ed.); George W. Stow (illust.)(London Swan Sonnenschein & Co. 1905)

== Bibliography ==
- The Life and Work of George William Stow, South African Geologist and Ethnologist – Prof. Robert Burns Young
