= Lesotho Catholic Bishops' Conference =

Assembly of Catholic bishops

The Lesotho Catholic Bishops' Conference is a member of the Inter-Regional Meeting of Bishops of Southern Africa (IMBISA) and Symposium of Episcopal Conferences of Africa and Madagascar (SECAM).

The local bishops are members of the Conference of Catholic Bishops of Lesotho (Lesotho Catholic Bishops' Conference).

== Presidents of the Bishops' Conference ==
1972–1982: Alfonso Liguori Morapeli, Archbishop of Maseru

1982–1987: Sebastian Koto Khoarai, Bishop of Mohale's Hoek

1987–1991: Paul Khoarai, Bishop of Leribe

1991–1997: Evaristus Thatho Bitsoane, bishop of Qacha's Nek

1997–2002: Bernard Mohlalisi, Archbishop of Maseru

2002–2010: Evaristus Thatho Bitsoane, bishop of Qacha's Nek

2011 – ... : Gerard Tlali Lerotholi, Archbishop of Maseru
