= Religion in Lesotho =

Religion in Lesotho (Afrobarometer 2022)
1. Protestantism (56.2%)
2. Catholicism (39.0%)
3. Others / None (4.80%)

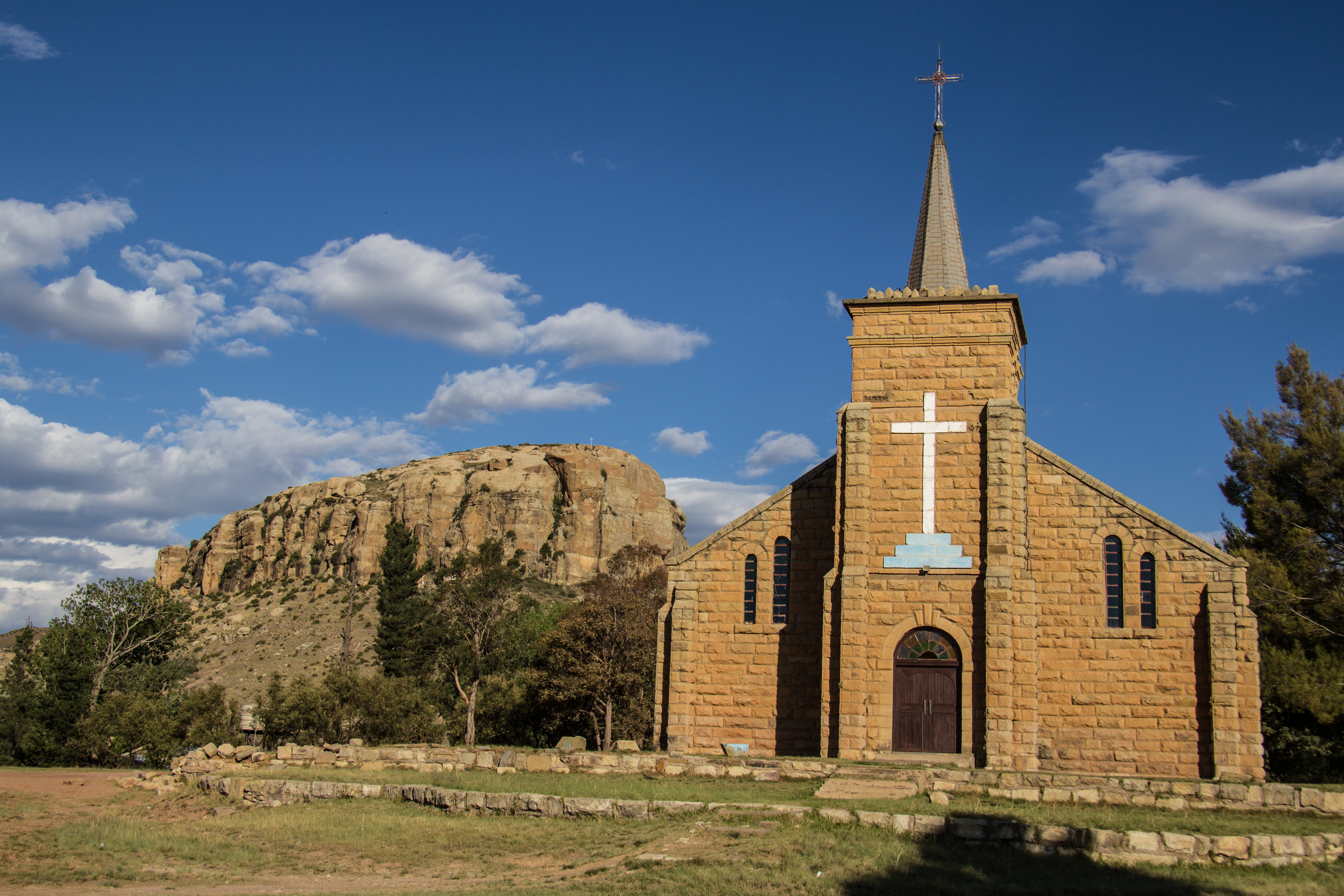
St. Michael's Cathedral. Lesotho is a predominantly Christian nation.

Christianity is the dominant religion in Lesotho, with Protestantism and Catholicism being its main denominations.

The 2022 Afrobarometer report found Protestants form 56.2% and Catholics form 39% of the population. Non-Christian religions represent only 1.5% of the population, and those of no religion 3.5%. The non-Christian people primarily subscribe to traditional African religions, with small groups of Muslims, Hindus and Baha'is.

== Christianity ==
Christianity arrived in Lesotho from French missions at the invitation of King Moshoeshoe I in the 1830s. While King Moshoeshoe I invited Christian missionaries, he retained his traditional religion and divorced two of his wives who had converted to Christianity. Initial reports of French evangelist missionaries alleged cannibalism as a part of Lesotho traditional religion. Later missionaries such as Henry Callaway, as well as anthropologists, consider those initial reports as unreliable and mythical, rather than a historical or true representation of the traditional religion of the Lesotho people.

The first Catholic mission started in 1863. It was called Motse-oa-'M'a-Jesu and led by Bishop Allard. He invited Holy Family Sisters from France to work with Sotho women. The initial efforts aimed at gaining converts as well as ending the practice of polygyny where old men paid a bride price to marry young girls. The later efforts attracted resistance from the traditional families. According to Allard's memoirs, Sotho women converted to Catholicism in larger numbers earlier than Sotho men.

The two Christian denominations have historic links to two major political parties in Lesotho. The Catholic Church has supported the Basotho National Party, while the Evangelicals have been aligned with the Basotho Congress Party. The nuncio accredited to South Africa represents the Holy See to the Lesotho government.

In 2020, Catholics accounted for 45 percent of the population while Protestants represented 31 percent and other Christians an additional 18 percent. The Catholic population is served by the province of the Metropolitan Archbishop of Maseru and his three suffragans (the bishops of Leribe, Mohale's Hoek and Qacha's Nek), who also form the national episcopal conference.

== Traditional religion ==
The traditional Sotho religion is traceable with archaeological evidence to around the 10th century. They share themes with the Tswana traditional religion. The Chief of a Sotho community was also their spiritual leader. Ancestor spirits called Badimo worship practices were a significant part of the Sotho community, along with rituals such as rainmaking dance. The Sotho had developed the concept of Modimo, the Supreme Being. The Modimo, in Sotho theology, created lesser deities with powers to interact with human beings.

Many Christians follows traditional Indigenous rituals along with Christianity. Since religious marriages needs to be conducted by clergy as per law, many followers of traditional religion can't get married, so they opt for civil marriages.

== Minority Religions ==
There is a small minority of Muslims, Hindus and Bahai in Lesotho. Muslims form 0.1 % of the population, according to the 2023 US Department of State Report. The Ahmadiyya Muslim community has about 350 members.

There were 150 Hindu families in Lesotho according to the 2009 US Department of State Report. The report noted that the Hindu and Muslim population has declined significantly due to emigration to South Africa.

== Religious rights ==
The Lesotho constitution protects the freedom of religion. In 2023, the country was scored 4 out of 4 for religious freedom.

== See also ==
- Anglican Diocese of Lesotho
- Catholic Church in Lesotho
- Christian Council of Lesotho
