= Joseph Mopeli Sephamola =

Lesothan Roman Catholic prelate (born 1960)

The Most Reverend Joseph Mopeli Sephamola
- Bishop of Qacha's Nek, Lesotho
- Church: Catholic Church
- Archdiocese: Roman Catholic Archdiocese of Maseru
- See: Qacha's Nek
- Appointed: 19 June 2013
- Installed: 21 September 2013
- Predecessor: Evaristus Thatho Bitsoane

Orders
- Ordination: 27 April 1991
- Consecration: 21 September 2013 by Gerard Tlali Lerotholi
- Rank: Bishop

Personal details
- Born: Joseph Mopeli Sephamola; 14 March 1960 (age 65); Tsoelike, Qacha's Nek District, Diocese of Qacha's Nek, Lesotho

Styles of Joseph Mopeli Sephamola
- Reference style: Your Lordship; The Most Reverend
- Spoken style: His Lordship
- Religious style: Bishop

Joseph Mopeli Sephamola O.M.I., (born 14 March 1960) is a Lesothan Roman Catholic prelate who is the Bishop of the Roman Catholic Diocese of Qacha's Nek, Lesotho. He is a member of the Order of the Missionary Oblates of Mary Immaculate. He was appointed bishop on 19 June 2013 by Pope Francis. He was installed at Qacha's Nek in September 2013.

== Early life and education ==
He was born on 14 March 1960 at Tsoelike, Qacha's Nek District, Diocese of Qacha's Nek, in Lesotho. He attended the St. Augustine's Major Seminary in Roma, Lesotho from 1984 until 1989. In 2000 he took a short course at the Oblate School of Theology. He studied at St Anselm's College in Merseyside, England from 2002, graduating from there with a Diploma in Human Growth and Development in 2003. In 2019, he studied at the University of Kwazulu Natal, graduating with a Master's degree in Spirituality (Theology).

== Priest ==
He professed to be a member of the Oblates of Mary Immaculate (OMI) on 6 January 1984. On 25 January 1989 he took his solemn vows as a member of that Roman Catholic Order. He was ordained a priest of the same Order on 27 April 1991.

Following his ordination, he served in various roles including as:

- Santa Maria Mission in Lukulu District in Zambia from 1991 until 1996.
- St. Lawrence of Brindisi, Limulunga in Mongu District, Zambia from 1996 until 2000.
- Formator at the Oblate Scholasticate in Roma, Lesotho from 2000 until 2002.
- Novice Master at the Villa Maria Novitiate in Quthing, Lesotho from 2004 until 2008.
- Formator at the Oblate Scholasticate, in Cedara, Kwazulu Natal, South Africa from 2009 until 2010.
- Provincial Superior of the Oblates in Lesotho since July 2011.

== Bishop ==
On 19 June 2013 Pope Francis appointed him bishop of the Roman Catholic Diocese of Qacha's Nek, a suffragan of the Metropolitan Archdiocese of Maseru. He was consecrated and installed on 21 September 2013 at Qacha's Nek, Diocese of Qacha's Nek, Lesotho.

The Principal Consecrator was Archbishop Gerard Tlali Lerotholi, Archbishop of Maseru assisted by Archbishop Jabulani Adatus Nxumalo, Archbishop of Bloemfontein and Bishop Augustinus Tumaole Bane, Bishop of Leribe.

== See also ==
- Catholic Church in Lesotho

== Succession table ==
Catholic Church titles
Preceded by Evaristus Thatho Bitsoane (17 July 1981 - 17 July 2010)	Bishop of Qacha's Nek (since 19 June 2013)	Succeeded by Incumbent
