= John Joale Tlhomola =

Lesothan Roman Catholic prelate (born 1966)

The Most Reverend John Joale Tlhomola
- Bishop of Mohale's Hoek, Lesotho
- Church: Catholic Church
- Archdiocese: Roman Catholic Archdiocese of Maseru
- See: Mohale's Hoek
- Appointed: 11 February 2014
- Installed: 10 May 2014
- Predecessor: Sebastian Koto Khoarai
- Successor: Incumbent

Orders
- Ordination: 28 Mar 1998
- Consecration: 10 May 2014 by Sebastian Koto Khoarai
- Rank: Bishop

Personal details
- Born: John Joale Tlhomola; 12 March 1966 (age 60) Pulane Ha Mosiuoa, Berea District, Archdiocese of Maseru, Lesotho

Styles of John Joale Tlhomola
- Reference style: Your Lordship; The Most Reverend
- Spoken style: His Lordship
- Religious style: Bishop

John Joale Tlhomola (Servants of Christ the Priest), (born 12 March 1966), is a Lesothan Roman Catholic prelate who is the Bishop of the Roman Catholic Diocese of Mohale's Hoek, Lesotho since February 2014. He was appointed bishop by Pope Francis on 11 February 2014. He was consecrated and installed at Mohale's Hoek on 10 May 2014.

== Background and education ==
He was born on 12 March 1966 in Pulane Ha Mosiuoa, Berea District, Archdiocese of Maseru, in Lesotho. He entered Seminary after completing primary and secondary school education. He started out at the Novitiate in the Secular Servants of Christ, the seminary in Hammanskraal, Gauteng Province, South Africa, where he studied from 1987 until 1988. He took his first vows as a member of the Order of the Servants of Christ the Priest (S.C.P.) in 1989. In 1995 he professed his perpetual vows. He was ordained a priest of his Catholic Religious Order on 28 March 1998.

== Priest ==
He was ordained a priest of the Servants of Christ the Priest Catholic Order on 28 March 1998. He served as priest until 11 February 2014.

After ordination, he served in various roles including as:

- Assistant priest at the Cathedral in Maseru from 1998 until 2001.
- Priest in charge of the Diocesan Cathedral in Maseru from 2001 until 2003.
- Pastor of Christ the Priest Mission, Motsekuoa, in the Diocese of Mohale's Hoek from 2003 until 2010.
- Treasurer of the St. Augustine's Major Seminary in Roma, Lesotho, from 2010 until 2011.
- Professor of Liturgy and Spirituality in the Preparatory Seminary in Lesotho, from 2010 until 2011.
- Director General of the Servants of Christ the Priest, in Hammanskraal, Archdiocese of Pretoria, since 2011.

== Bishop ==
On 11 February 2014 he was appointed Bishop of Mohale's Hoek, Lesotho by Pope Francis. On 10 May 2014, he was consecrated and installed at Mohale's Hoek, Diocese of Mohale's Hoek in southern Lesotho by the hands of Bishop Sebastian Koto Khoarai, Bishop Emeritus of Mohale's Hoek assisted by Archbishop William Matthew Slattery, Archbishop of Pretoria and Archbishop Gerard Tlali Lerotholi, Archbishop of Maseru.

== See also ==
- Catholic Church in Lesotho

== Succession table ==
Catholic Church titles
Preceded by Sebastian Koto Khoarai (10 November 1977 - 11 February 2014)	Bishop of Mohale's Hoek (since 11 February 2014)	Succeeded by Incumbent
