= List of Catholic dioceses in Lesotho =

The Roman Catholic Church in Lesotho is composed of 1 ecclesiastical province and 3 suffragan dioceses.

== List of Roman Catholic dioceses ==
=== Episcopal Conference of Lesotho ===
==== Ecclesiastical Province of Maseru ====
- Archdiocese of Maseru
  - Diocese of Mohale’s Hoek
  - Diocese of Qacha’s Nek
  - Diocese of Leribe
