= Cathedral of the Holy Redeemer (Qacha's Nek, Lesotho) =

- Cathedral of the Holy Redeemer
- 30°06′55″S 28°41′44″E
- Location: Qacha's Nek
- Country: Lesotho
- Denomination: Roman Catholic Church

Administration
- Province: Maseru
- Diocese: Qacha's Nek

The Cathedral of the Holy Redeemer is a Roman Catholic cathedral located in the city of Qacha's Nek, Lesotho. It is the seat of the Roman Catholic Diocese of Qacha's Nek.

== See also ==
- Roman Catholicism in Lesotho
