= Dan Kgomosotho =

Dan Kgomosotho is a South African Anglican bishop: he has been the Bishop of Mpumalanga since 2010. Until the 14 February 2026.

== Notes ==
Anglican Church of Southern Africa titles
Preceded by Les Walker	Bishop of Mpumalanga; 2010–	Incumbent
