= Vitalis Sekhonyana Marole =

Mosotho Roman Catholic prelate (born 1954)

The Most Reverend Vitalis Sekhonyana Marole
- Bishop-Elect of Leribe, Lesotho
- Church: Catholic Church
- Archdiocese: Roman Catholic Archdiocese of Maseru
- See: Leribe
- Appointed: 28 February 2025
- Installed: 10 May 2025
- Predecessor: Augustinus Tumaole Bane

Orders
- Ordination: 3 December 1988 by George Francis Daniel
- Consecration: 10 May 2025
- Rank: Bishop

Personal details
- Born: Vitalis Sekhonyana Marole; 10 December 1954 (age 70); Semonkong, Maseru District, Diocese of Maseru, Lesotho

Styles of Vitalis Sekhonyana Marole
- Reference style: Your Lordship; The Most Reverend
- Spoken style: His Lordship
- Religious style: Bishop

Vitalis Sekhonyana Marole O.M.I., (born 10 December 1954) is a Mosotho Roman Catholic prelate who is the Bishop-Elect of the Roman Catholic Diocese of Leribe, Lesotho. He is a member of the Order of the Missionary Oblates of Mary Immaculate. He was appointed bishop on 28 February 2025 by Pope Francis.

== Early life and education ==
He was born on 10 December 1954 at Semonkong, Maseru District, Diocese of Maseru, in Lesotho. He studied philosophy at the Oblate Scholasticate in Lesotho. He then studied theology at the Saint John Vianney National Major Seminary in Pretoria, South Africa. He was ordained priest on 3 December 1988.

== Priest ==
He was ordained a priest of the Order of Institute of Consecrated Life on 3 December 1988 by the hands of Archbishop George Francis Daniel, Archbishop of Pretoria. The ceremony took place at Our Lady of Victory Cathedral, in Maseru, Archdiocese of Maseru, Lesotho. He took his perpetual vows as a member of the Oblates of Mary Immaculate (OMI) on 9 December 1996.

Following his ordination, he served in various roles including as:

- Parish priest of Saint Elizabeth's Parish in Mamaneng, Pretoria from 1988 until 1992.
- Parish priest of Saint Peter Parish in Kagiso 1, Johannesburg from 1993 until 1994.
- Member of the formative team for the pre-novitiate of Rayton, Pretoria from 1994 until 1998.
- Parish priest of Saint Raphael Parish in Mamelodi, Pretoria from 1994 until 2000
- Vicar forane of the Eastern Deanery from 1999 until 2000.
- Master of novices at the International Oblate Novitiate, Johannesburg from 2002 until 2009 and from 2015 until 2016.
- Parish priest of Saint Anne Parish in Atteridgeville from 2011 until 2013.
- Chaplain of Holy Trinity High School, Pretoria from 2011 until 2013.
- Chaplain of Saint Benedict's College in Bedfordview from 2013 until 2014.
- Parish priest of Saint Peter's Parish in Cullinan from 2015 until 2017.
- Parish Priest of Saint Eugene of Mazenod in Refilwe from 2015 until 2017.
- Parish priest of the Queen of the Most Holy Rosary Parish in Waverley, in the metropolitan archdiocese of Pretoria from 2018 until 2025.
- Consultor of the same archdiocese, as well as provincial consultor of the Missionary Oblates of Mary Immaculate in South Africa from 2018 until 2025.

== Bishop ==
On 28 January 2025 Pope Francis appointed him bishop of the Roman Catholic Diocese of Leribe, a suffragan of the Metropolitan Archdiocese of Maseru. His consecration and installation are scheduled on 10 May 2025 at St. Monica's Cathedral, in Leribe, Diocese of Leribe, Lesotho.

== See also ==
- Catholic Church in Lesotho

== Succession table ==
Catholic Church titles
Preceded by Augustinus Tumaole Bane (30 June 2009 - 28 February 2025)	Bishop of Leribe (since 25 February 2025)	Succeeded by Incumbent
