= Community of the Holy Name =

Religious order

The Community of the Holy Name (CHN) is an international Anglican religious order for women. The full name of the community is The Community of the Mission Sisters of the Holy Name of Jesus, usually shortened to Community of the Holy Name. The order currently operates in Europe and Africa. There is also an order operating in Australia with the same name which has an independent history, having been founded entirely separately.

== Structure ==
The community is grouped into geographical provinces, of which there are currently three, the English province, and the Lesotho and Zululand provinces in Southern Africa. Each has an elected provincial superior and an assistant superior who is appointed by the provincial superior. There is no superior general of the order and authority to direct the order arises out of regular meetings of the chapter of each province in accordance with the constitution of the province. The chapter consists of all life-professed sisters. While all three provinces follow the same rule of life, there are local variations of practice in accordance with local tradition and culture. Each province has a bishop visitor.

== History ==
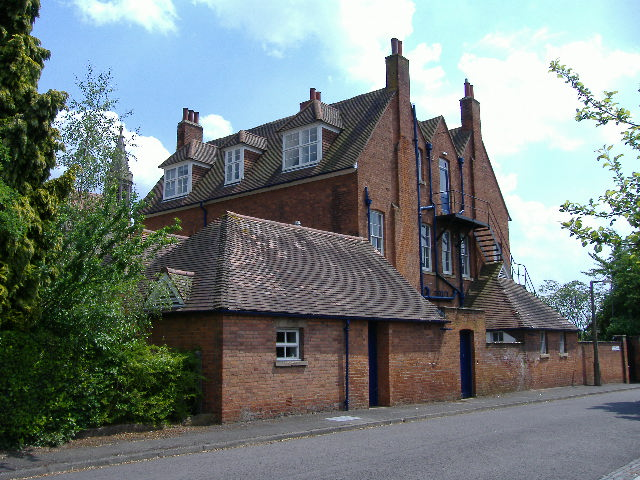
The former Convent Of The Holy Name, Ranelagh Road, Malvern Link

The community was founded in 1865 by Father George William Herbert (3 October 1830 – 14 November 1894), parish priest of St Peter's Church, Vauxhall, London. Mother Frances Mary was not the first mother superior, but she and Father Herbert drew the fledgling group of sisters together into a vibrant community. The community was originally called St Peter's Sisterhood and worked alongside the parish priest and his assistants in helping the deprived and poor of the parish. By 1876 the community had taken as its dedication "The Holy Name of Jesus", thus reflecting a vocation of reaching out to others in the name of "Jesus, Saviour". The founders drew inspiration from both the Catholic and Evangelical movements.

In 1887 the mother house (the Convent of the Holy Name) was established at Malvern Link, Worcestershire, while mission houses remained in London and elsewhere in the UK. The chapel (1891-3) at Malvern by Sir Ninian Comper and William Bucknall is now a Grade II* listed building.

In 1962 CHN opened a community house in Lesotho in southern Africa amalgamating with the Community of St Mary at the Cross. In 1969 CHN opened a community house in Zululand, South Africa.

The community in England moved to Oakwood, Derby in 1990.

== Provinces and convents ==
=== English province ===
CHN moved to its current location in Hessle in the East Riding of Yorkshire in June 2021. The sisters there are active in local churches and activities as well as social issues. Currently there are 17 sisters in the English province; two of the sisters live a solitary life and two sisters are in residential care.

=== Lesotho province ===
In 1959, Bishop John Maund, Bishop of Basutoland, invited CHN to establish a branch house in Basutoland, amalgamating with the Community of St Mary at the Cross, a small African community that had been founded by the Community of St Michael and All Angels who had worked in Leribe for many years but were now withdrawing. CHN agreed but with the condition that the African sisters and the English sisters would no longer be segregated as they had been with the St Michael sisters. The African sisters agreed to this and after some training in England by four of the African sisters, the four African sisters and five English sisters arrived at the house in Leribe. The intention to live as one community was a powerful statement in the face of the Apartheid regime that was coming into force just across the border in South Africa.

The sisters today work extensively with both school children and victims of AIDS.

=== KwaZulu-Natal province ===
Founded by sisters from England and Lesotho in 1969, KwaZulu-Natal is the newest province of the order. The provincial mother house is in Melmoth. The sisters work in local parishes, and also in hospitals and schools. The convents of this province are:

- Luyengo, Swaziland
- Melmoth (provincial mother house)
- Nongoma
- Rosettenville (St Benedict's House)
