= Sebastian Koto Khoarai =

Mosotho Catholic cardinal (1929–2021)

His Eminence Sebastian Koto Khoarai O.M.I.
- Bishop Emeritus of Mohale's Hoek, Lesotho (Deceased)
- Church: Roman Catholic Church
- Archdiocese: Roman Catholic Archdiocese of Maseru
- Diocese: Roman Catholic Diocese of Mohale's Hoek
- Appointed: 10 November 1977
- Installed: 2 April 1978
- Term ended: 11 February 2014
- Predecessor: None
- Successor: John Joale Tlhomola
- Other post: Cardinal-Priest of San Leonardo da Porto Maurizio ad Acilia (2016-2021)
- Previous post: President of the Episcopal Conference of Lesotho (1982-1987)

Orders
- Ordination: 21 December 1956
- Consecration: 2 April 1978 by Alfonso Liguori Morapeli
- Created cardinal: 19 November 2016 by Pope Francis
- Rank: Cardinal Priest

Personal details
- Born: Sebastian Koto Khoarai; September 11, 1929 Koaling, Lesotho
- Died: 17 April 2021 (aged 91) Mazenod, Lesotho
- Coat of arms: Sebastian Koto Khoarai's coat of arms

Ordination history of Sebastian Koto Khoarai
History
Episcopal consecration
- Principal consecrator: Alfonso Liguori Morapeli
- Co-consecrators: Joseph Patrick Fitzgerald; Paul Khoarai
Cardinalate
- Elevated by: Pope Francis
Episcopal succession
Bishops consecrated by Sebastian Koto Khoarai as principal consecrator
- John Joale Tlhomola: 10 May 2014

Styles of Sebastian Koto Khoarai
- Reference style: His Eminence
- Spoken style: Your Eminence
- Religious style: Cardinal
- Informal style: Cardinal

Sebastian Koto Khoarai, O.M.I. (11 September 1929 – 17 April 2021) was a prelate of the Catholic Church who was bishop of Mohale's Hoek, Lesotho from 1977 to 2014. He was made a cardinal in 2016 and was the first and so far the only cardinal from Lesotho.

== Biography ==
Khoarai was born in Koaling in the diocese of Leribe in 1929. He entered the Oblates of Mary Immaculate and was ordained a priest in 1956.

In 1977 he was appointed bishop of Mohale's Hoek. He received his episcopal consecration in 1978. In May 2006, he submitted his resignation upon reaching the age limit of 75, but it was not accepted until February 2014. From 1982 to 1987 he served as president of the Episcopal Conference of Lesotho.

On 9 October 2016, Pope Francis announced that Khoarai would be created a cardinal on 19 November 2016 and become Lesotho's first cardinal. Due to his health he was unable to attend the consistory on 19 November, but he later received the biretta in Lesotho from the apostolic nuncio Peter Bryan Wells.

Khoarai died on 17 April 2021 at the age of 91.5 years.

Catholic Church titles
| Preceded by diocese established | Bishop of Mohale's Hoek; 10 November 1977—10 February 2014 | Succeeded by John Joale Tlhomola |
| Preceded by titular church established | Cardinal Priest of San Leonardo da Porto Maurizio ad Acilia; 19 November 2016 – 17 April 2021 | Succeeded by Leonardo Ulrich Steiner |
