= Mbhashe =

Mbhashe may refer to a number of things in the Eastern Cape province of South Africa:

- the Mbhashe River, formerly the Bashee River
- the Mbhashe Local Municipality
- the Anglican Diocese of Mbhashe
