= Adam Taaso =

- Citizenship: Lesotho
- Occupations: Poet; Anglican bishop; Bishop of lesotho

Adam Mallane Taaso was the bishop of Lesotho from 2008 until 2020. He resigned his see due to health reason.

Taaso was educated at the National University of Lesotho. He was a priest in the Diocese of Lesotho since 1993, during that time he was also a teacher. In 2008 he became the bishop of Lesotho.

He was embroiled in a financial scandal in 2016.

He and his wife Matsepo have four children and four grandchildren. Taaso is the author of Seponono, a book of Sesotho poetry.
