= Margaret Vertue =

South African Anglican bishop

The Right Reverend Margaret Brenda Vertue
- Bishop of False Bay
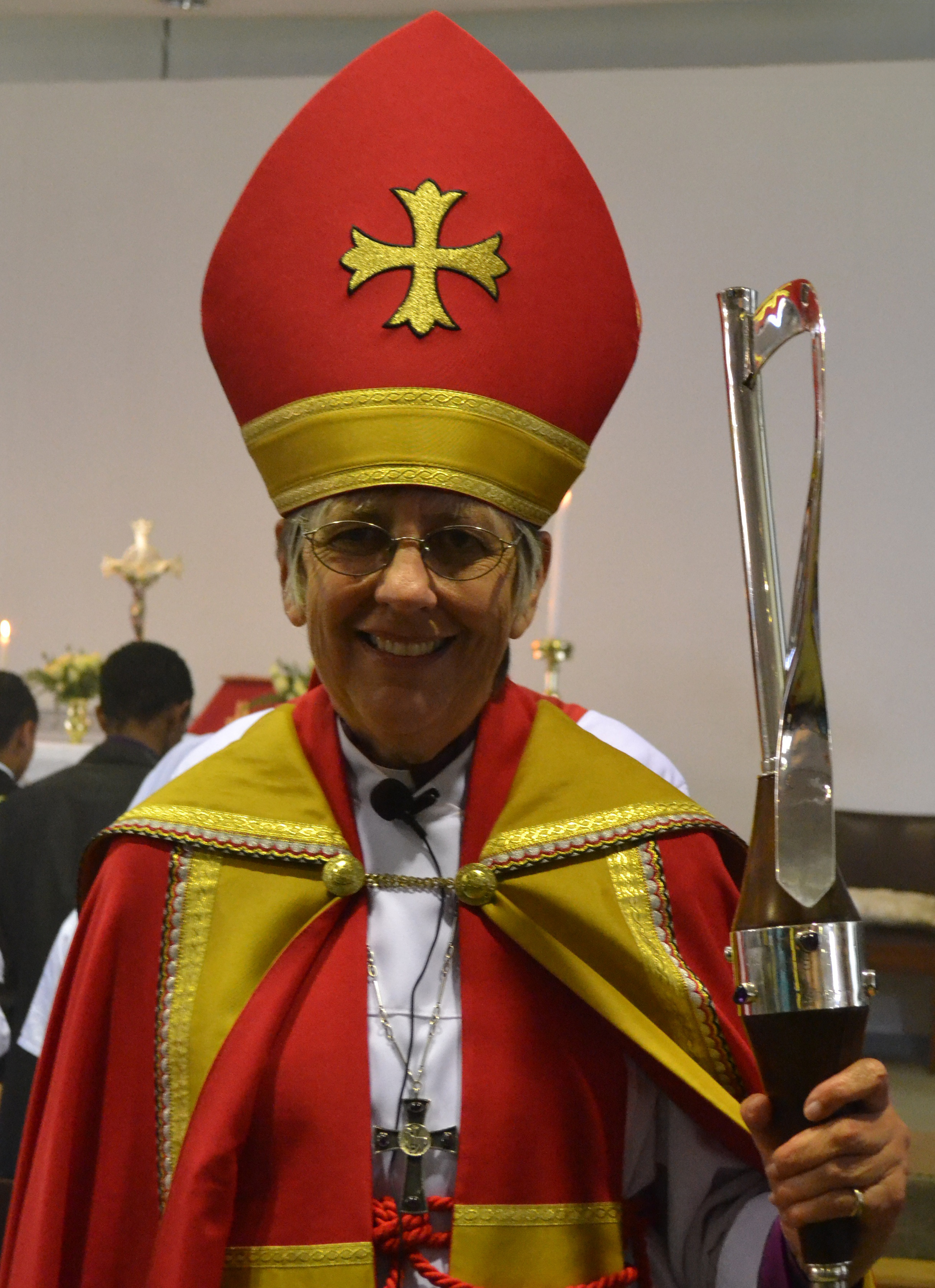
- Bishop Margaret
- Church: Anglican Church of Southern Africa
- Province: Western Cape
- Diocese: Diocese of False Bay
- Elected: 3 October 2012
- In office: 3 October 2012 – 31 August 2023
- Predecessor: Merwyn Castle
- Successor: Stafford Moses

Orders
- Ordination: September 1992
- Consecration: 19 January 2013 by Thabo Makgoba

Personal details
- Born: 6 April 1953 (age 73) Kimberley, Cape Province, Union of South Africa
- Denomination: Anglicanism

Margaret Brenda Vertue (born 6 April 1953) is a retired South African Anglican bishop. She was the second woman to be elected as a bishop of the Anglican Church of Southern Africa and of the whole African continent, as the diocesan bishop of the Anglican Diocese of False Bay.

Vertue was educated at the Convent of the Holy Family in Kimberley and studied at St Paul's Theological College, Grahamstown (now the College of the Transfiguration), at Stellenbosch University and at St Beuno's, North Wales. She was ordained as one of the first woman priests by Archbishop Desmond Tutu in September 1992. She was preceded by Merwyn Castle.

She was elected Bishop of the Diocese of False Bay on 3 October 2012 by the Diocesan Elective Assembly and consecrated as Bishop on 19 January 2013 by the Most Reverend Thabo Makgoba, Archbishop of Cape Town.

Bishop Margaret's tenure as bishop of False Bay ended on 31 August 2023 as she entered retirement.

== Bibliography ==
- Anon (9 October 2012). "Second female Anglican bishop elected by Southern Africa". Anglican Journal.
- Kannemeyer, AJ (10 April 2012). "Canon Margaret Vertue elected as the next Bishop of the Diocese of False Bay" (Press release). Cape Town: Anglican Church of Southern Africa (ACSA). Archived from the original on 11 October 2014.
- Hartle, Ray (20 January 2013). "SA chooses female bishop". IOL News.
- Anon (6 March 2023). "Celebration of the 30th Anniversary of the Ordination of women priests feast of St Michael and all Angels – 29 September 2022". False Bay Diocese.

Anglican Church of Southern Africa titles
Preceded by Merwyn Castle	Bishop of False Bay; 2012 -	Incumbent
