= Bernard Mohlalisi =

Mosotho Roman Catholic bishop (1933–2020)

Bernard Mosiuoa Mohlalisi O.M.I.
- Archbishop of Maseru
- Church: Catholic Church
- Archdiocese: Archdiocese of Maseru
- In office: 11 June 1990 – 30 June 2009
- Predecessor: Alfonso Liguori Morapeli
- Successor: Gerard Tlali Lerotholi
- Other post: Apostolic Administrator of Qacha's Nek (2012-2013)

Orders
- Ordination: 14 July 1963 by Emanuel Mabathoana
- Consecration: 7 October 1990 by Ambrose De Paoli

Personal details
- Born: 16 March 1933
- Died: 24 July 2020 (aged 87) Mazenod, Maseru District, Lesotho

Styles of Bernard Mohlalisi
- Reference style: The Most Reverend
- Spoken style: Your Excellency
- Religious style: Monsignor
- Posthumous style: none

Bernard Mosiuoa Mohlalisi O.M.I. (16 March 1933 – 24 July 2020) was the Archbishop of the Roman Catholic Archdiocese of Maseru in Lesotho from 1990 to 2009. On 30 June 2009, his resignation due to age was accepted by Pope Benedict XVI. He was succeeded as Archbishop by Gerard Tlali Lerotholi, O.M.I., a professor at the National University of Lesotho.

Mohlalisi was ordained as a priest on 14 July 1963.
