= Ignatius Phakoe =

Roman Catholic bishop

Ignatius Phakoe O.M.I.
- Bishop of Leribe
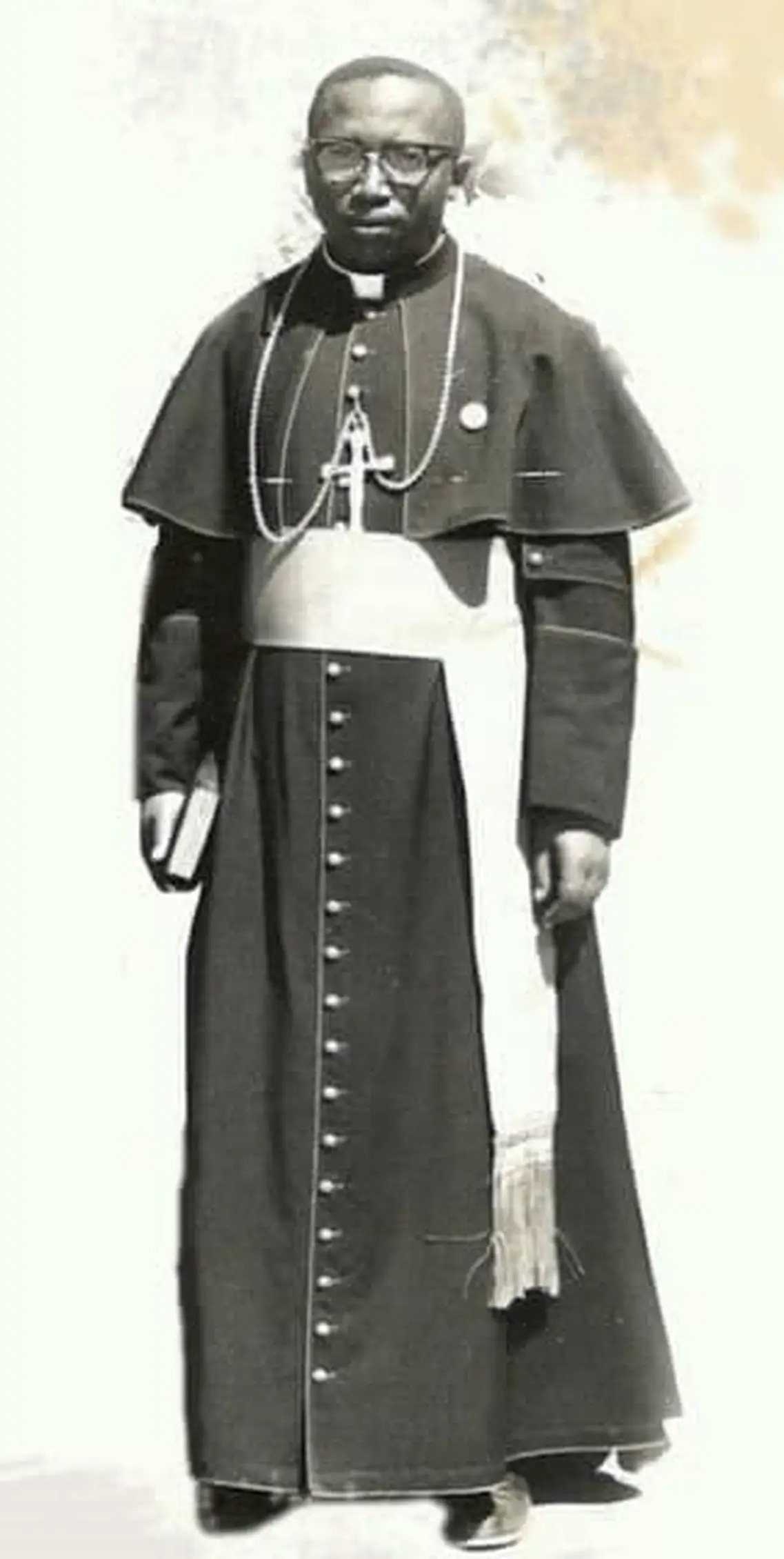
- Church: Catholic Church
- Diocese: Diocese of Leribe
- In office: 3 January 1961 – 18 June 1968
- Predecessor: Emanuel Mabathoana
- Successor: Paul Khoarai
- Other post: Titular Bishop of Bettonium (1968-1989)

Orders
- Ordination: 7 July 1952
- Consecration: 21 May 1961 by Pope John XXIII

Personal details
- Born: 9 July 1927 Koro-Koro (southwest of Roma), Maseru District, Colony of Basutoland, British Empire
- Died: 23 July 1989 (aged 62)

Ignatius Phakoe (born 9 July 1927 in Koro-Koro – 23 July 1989) was a Mosotho clergyman and bishop for the Roman Catholic Diocese of Leribe. He became ordained in 1952. He was appointed bishop in 1961. He died on 23 July 1989, at the age of 62.
