= Elliot Williams (disambiguation) =

Elliot Williams (born 1989) is an American former professional basketball player. The name may also refer to:

- Elliot Williams (bishop), a South African bishop
- Elliot Williams (author), a legal analyst and author
- Eliot Williams, a British author, army officer, and politician
- Elliot Williams (rugby union) (born 2007)
