= Cathedral of the Resurrection, Ikageng =

Church in Ikageng, South Africa

Coordinates: 26.7034°S 27.0279°E

The Cathedral of the Resurrection, is a religious building that is affiliated with the Anglican Church of South Africa and is located at 85 St Georges Street in Ikageng in Northwest Province, South Africa.

It serves as the main church and seat of the Diocese of Matlosane which was founded in 1990, divided from the Anglican Diocese of Johannesburg. The current incumbent is Edward Sithole.
