= St. Patrick's Cathedral, Mohale's Hoek =

Coordinates: 30°9′S 27°27′E

St. Patrick's Cathedral
- St. Patrick's Cathedral
- Location: Mohale's Hoek
- Country: Lesotho
- Denomination: Roman Catholic Church

Administration
- Diocese: Roman Catholic Diocese of Mohale's Hoek

The St. Patrick's Cathedral or simply Cathedral of Mohale's Hoek, is a religious building in the town of Mohale's Hoek, part of the district of the same name in the African country of Lesotho.

== History ==
St. Patrick's Cathedral is one of the five Catholic cathedrals that exist in that nation. The cathedral follows the Roman Catholic or Latin rite and serves as the seat of the Diocese of Mohale's Hoek (Dioecesis Mohaleshoekensis created in 1977 by Pope Paul VI by bull Ut fert creditum) that is included in the ecclesiastical province of Maseru and depends on the congregation for the evangelization of peoples (Congregatio pro Gentium Evangelizatione).

It is under the pastoral responsibility of the Bishop John Joale Tlhomola.

== See also ==
- Roman Catholicism in Lesotho
- St. Patrick's Cathedral (disambiguation)
