= Les Walker =

Les Walker may refer to:

- Les Walker (bishop), South African Anglican bishop
- Les Walker (politician) (born 1965), Australian politician
