= David Nkwe =

David Cecil Tapi Nkwe (1935-2008) was a South African Anglican bishop: he was the Bishop of Matlosane from 1990 to 2006.

He was rector of St Paul, Soweto from 1965 to 1990. He was elected to start the Diocese of Matlosane with headquarters in Klerksdorp, North West. He remained the bishop of Matlosane until he retired in 2006. He was buried in Westpark Cemetery after a service at Christ the King Church in Sophiatown.

== Notes ==
Anglican Church of Southern Africa titles
Preceded by Inaugural appointment	Bishop of Matlosane; 1990 –2006	Succeeded by Molopi Diseko
