= Mabathoana High School =

Secondary school in Maseru, Lesotho

Coordinates: 29.319488°S 27.497531°E

- Maseru; Lesotho

Information
- Motto: Do the right things at the right time
- Religious affiliation: Catholicism
- Established: 1965; 61 years ago
- Founder: Sisters of the Holy Names of Jesus and Mary
- Alumni: Sam Matekane

Mabathoana High School is a Catholic secondary school in Maseru, Lesotho.

In 1965, together with his staff, Archbishop of Maseru Emanuel Mabathoana oversaw the founding of the second high school in Maseru. They worked with the Sisters of the Holy Names of Jesus and Mary, a Maseru congregation of religious women with the mission of education to provide leadership and staffing.

The school was opened in 1965 and named Mabathoana High School in honor of the Archbishop, who died seven months after formally blessing its new building. Having opened with 80 students, the school now enrolls over 1000 students in total.

== Notable alumni ==
- Frank Leepa, jazz musician and founder of Sankomota
- Nicholas Lesia, farmer, doctor with Partners in Health, and player for the Lesotho national baseball team
- Sam Matekane, Prime Minister of Lesotho
- Thabang Makwetla, South African politician

== Notable faculty ==
- Mbulelo Mzamane, South African author, poet, and academic
