= Vicentia Kgabe =

Anglican Lesotho female bishop

The Right Reverend Vincentia Kgabe Ph.D
- Rector of the College of the Transfiguration
- Province: Anglican Church of Southern Africa
- Predecessor: Barney Pityana

Orders
- Ordination: 2003
- Consecration: December 2021

Right. Rev Dr Vicentia Refiloe Kgabe is the twelfth and current Bishop Anglican Diocese of Pretoria. in South Africa. She was previously the seventh bishop of Diocese of Lesotho, before 22 September 2025, when the Electoral College of Bishops elected her as Bishop of Pretoria. She was enthroned as bishop at St Albans Cathedral (Pretoria) on 13 December 2025.

== Early life and education ==
Born in Soweto, Kgabe attended schools in Soweto, she started her theological training at the College of the Transfiguration. She undertook further theological studies at the University of Pretoria where she obtained a PhD in Practical Theology in 2011. She has also attended Pretoria University's Gordon Institute of Business Science (GIBS) leadership programme.

== Clerical career ==
Kgabe was made deacon in 2002 and was ordained as a priest in 2003. She served as rector of the Parish of Weltevreden St Michael and All Angels, a position she has held since 2013. She has, however, served in parishes around the Diocese of Johannesburg since her ordination. She was an archdeacon in the Diocese of Johannesburg, where she has had responsibility for the promotion and discernment of vocations to the ordained ministry of the church.

In 2014 she was appointed rector of the College of the Transfiguration.

In 2021 she was elected as bishop of Lesotho. She was consecrated in December 2021.

== Other work ==
Member of the board for Hope Africa and of the council of the College of the Transfiguration.

== Publications ==
- Abuse of Alcohol by Clergy: Challenge to Pastoral Care. LAP Lambert Academic Publishers. 2011. ISBN 978-3-8465-2958-4.
- Abuse of alcohol by Anglican clergy : challenge to pastoral care (Ph.D. thesis). Pretoria: University of Pretoria. 8 September 2011.
- Traumatic experience of church going girls who fall pregnant out of wedlock : challenge to pastoral care (M.Th. thesis). Pretoria: University of Pretoria. 5 September 2007.

== Notes and references ==
- Zulu, Bellah (12 August 2014). "SA Anglicans appoint first woman to lead theological college". Anglican News.
- "HOPE Africa Board". Hope Africa. 2012. Archived from the original on 13 September 2014.
- "Statement" (PDF) (Press release). Grahamstown: College of the Transfiguration. 1 July 2014. Archived from the original (PDF) on 13 September 2014.

== See also ==
- Diocese of Lesotho
- Religion in Lesotho
