= Vacancy =

Vacancy or No Vacancy may refer to:

== Economics ==
- Vacancy (economics) or job opening, a position offered by a business that wishes to hire a worker
- Vacancy (housing), unoccupied houses in a community

== Film and television ==
- Vacancy (film), a 2007 American horror film
- "Vacancy" (Law & Order: Criminal Intent), a 2006 television episode
- "No Vacancy" (Cagney & Lacey), a 1987 television episode
- No Vacancy, a fictional rock band in the 2003 film School of Rock
- No Vacancy (1999 film)
- No Vacancy, a 2012 film also known as The Helpers

== Music ==
=== Albums ===
- Vacancy (Bayside album), 2016
- Vacancy (Ari Lennox album), 2026
- Vacancy (EP), a 1999 EP by Joseph Arthur
- No Vacancy – The Best of The Motels, 1990 compilation album by The Motels

=== Songs ===
- "Vacancy" (song), a 2008 single by a Japanese-American singer Kylee
- "Vacancy", by Joseph Arthur from Vacancy
- "Vacancy", by Neil Young from unreleased album Homegrown
- "Vacancy", by Harry Chapin from Verities & Balderdash
- "No Vacancy" (Merle Travis song), 1946 song by Merle Travis and Cliffie Stone
- "No Vacancy" (OneRepublic song), 2017 song by OneRepublic

== Other uses ==
- Vacancy defect, a type of point defect in a crystal

== See also ==
- Casual vacancy (disambiguation)
- Vacancy 2: The First Cut, a 2009 American direct-to-video film
- Legislative vacancy (United States), vacancy in a legislature caused by the death, resignation, or removal of a legislator
- Papal vacancy, vacancy caused by the death or resignation of a pope
