= Merwyn Castle =

South African Anglican bishop (1942–2021)

Merwyn Edwin Castle (2 November 1942 - 2 August 2021) was an Anglican Bishop of the Diocese of False Bay. On 5 February 1994, Castle was consecrated as a bishop . On 27 April 2007, he was enthroned as the bishop of the Diocese of False Bay. Merwyn Castle was openly gay and identified as celibate. Upon his retirement, Margaret Vertue was elected and consecrated as the new bishop on 19 January 2013. Castle died on 2 August 2021 at the age of 78. He was cremated and his ashes interred under the altar of the All Saints Anglican Church in Somerset West.
