= Anglican Church of Southern Africa =

Province of the Anglican Communion in Southern Africa

- Classification: Protestant
- Orientation: Anglican
- Scripture: Holy Bible
- Theology: Anglican doctrine
- Polity: Episcopal
- Primate: Thabo Makgoba; Archbishop of Cape Town
- Headquarters: 20 Bishopscourt Drive, Bishopscourt, 7708 Cape Town, South Africa
- Territory: Eswatini; Lesotho; Namibia; Saint Helena; South Africa
- Origin: 20 September 1870
- Independence: 1870; 156 years ago
- Members: c. 3–4 million
- Official website: anglicanchurchsa.org

The Anglican Church of Southern Africa, known until 2006 as the Church of the Province of Southern Africa, is the province of the Anglican Communion in the southern part of Africa. The church has twenty-five dioceses, of which twenty-one are located in South Africa, and one each in Eswatini, Lesotho, Namibia and Saint Helena.

The Anglican Church of Southern Africa claims 3–3.57 million members. In the 2001 South African Census, there were a recorded 1.7 million Anglicans out of a total South African population of close to 45 million. No census information has been available since although further studies have been done. The Anglican Church of Southern Africa estimated in 2006 that there were between 3 and 4 million Anglicans across Angola, Lesotho, Swaziland, Mozambique, Namibia, South Africa and the island of St Helena. A study published in 2020 produced an estimated figure of 2.3 million (4%) Anglicans in South Africa as of 2015. In 2021, the World Christian Database produced an estimated figure of 3,502,000 Anglicans or 6% of the population of South Africa as of 2020. Anglicans were estimated to make up around 167,388 people or 7.4% of the population of Lesotho in 2021. The Diocese of Swaziland had 90,000 members in 2021. In Namibia, 17% of the population, or 374,000 people, are Anglicans as of 2013. The majority of Saint Helena's population of 4,439 people are Anglicans. In 2017, Growth and Decline in the Anglican Communion: 1980 to the Present, published by Routledge, collected research reporting there were 3,007,200 Anglicans in the countries forming part of the Anglican Church of Southern Africa, excluding Angola and Mozambique.

Up until September 2021 four dioceses in Mozambique and Angola (three in Mozambique and one in Angola) were part of Anglican Church of Southern Africa, these dioceses now form part of the Anglican Church of Mozambique and Angola.

The primate is the Archbishop of Cape Town. The current archbishop is Thabo Makgoba, who succeeded Njongonkulu Ndungane in 2006. From 1986 to 1996 the primate was Nobel Peace Prize laureate Desmond Tutu.

== History ==
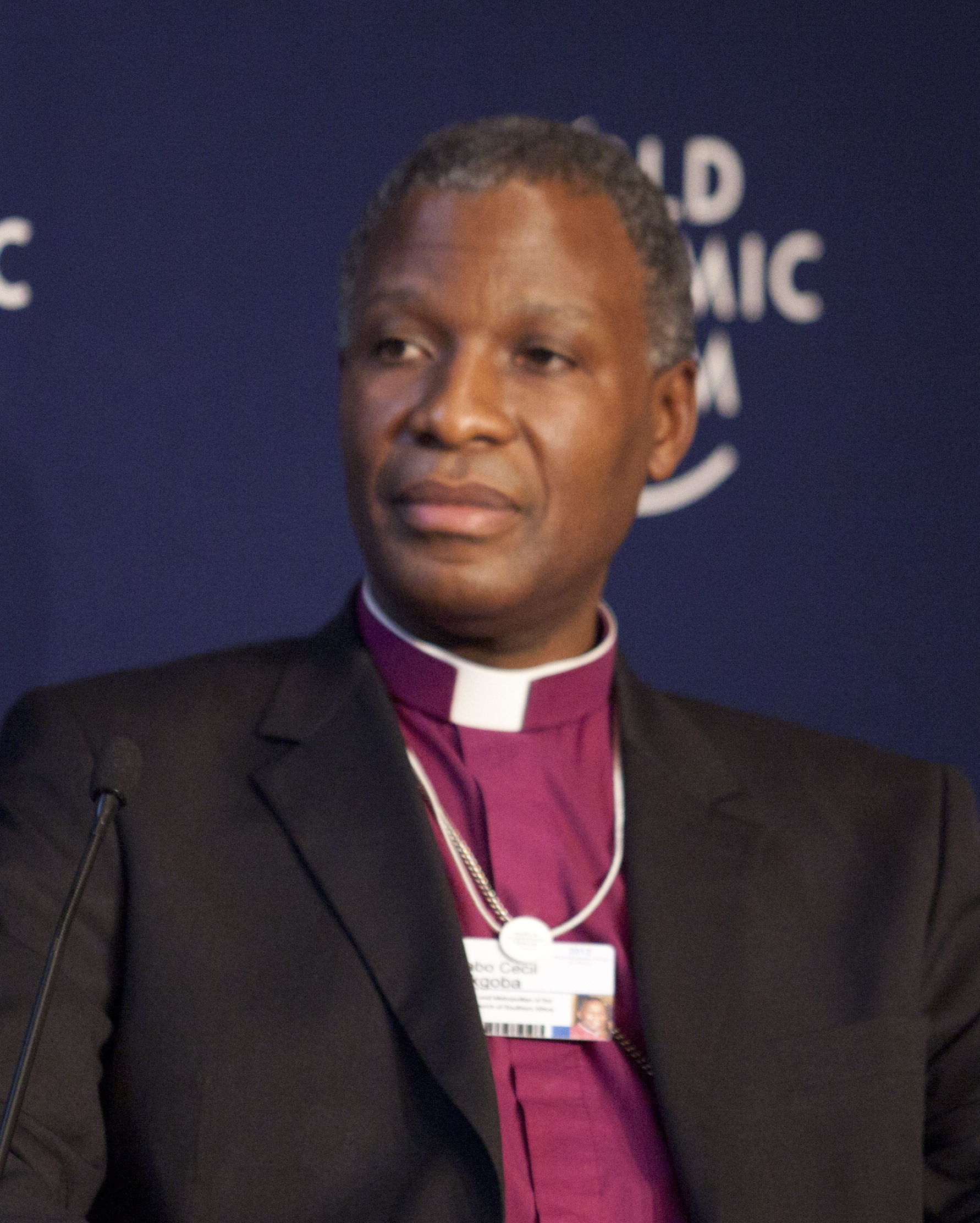
Thabo Makgoba is the current Archbishop of Cape Town.

The first Anglican clergy to minister regularly at the Cape were military chaplains who accompanied the troops when the British occupied the Cape Colony in 1795 and then again in 1806. The second British occupation resulted in a growing influx of civil servants and settlers who were members of the Church of England, and so civil or colonial chaplains were appointed to minister to their needs. These were under the authority of the Governor.

The first missionary of the Society for the Propagation of the Gospel arrived in 1821. He was William Wright, a priest. He opened a church and school in Wynberg, a fashionable suburb of Cape Town. Allen Gardiner, a missionary of the Church Missionary Society went to Zululand, and arranged for a priest, Francis Owen to be sent to the royal residence of King Dingane. Owen witnessed the massacre of Piet Retief, the Voortrekker leader, and his companions, who had come to negotiate a land treaty with Dingane, and left soon afterwards.

The Anglican Church in Southern Africa was at that time under the Diocese of Calcutta, which effectively included the East Indies and the entire Southern Hemisphere. Bishops en route for Calcutta sometimes stopped at the Cape for confirmations, and occasionally ordination of clergy, but these visits were sporadic. It became apparent that a bishop was needed for South Africa, and in 1847 Robert Gray was consecrated as the first Bishop of Cape Town at Westminster Abbey. The new bishop landed in Cape Town in 1848.

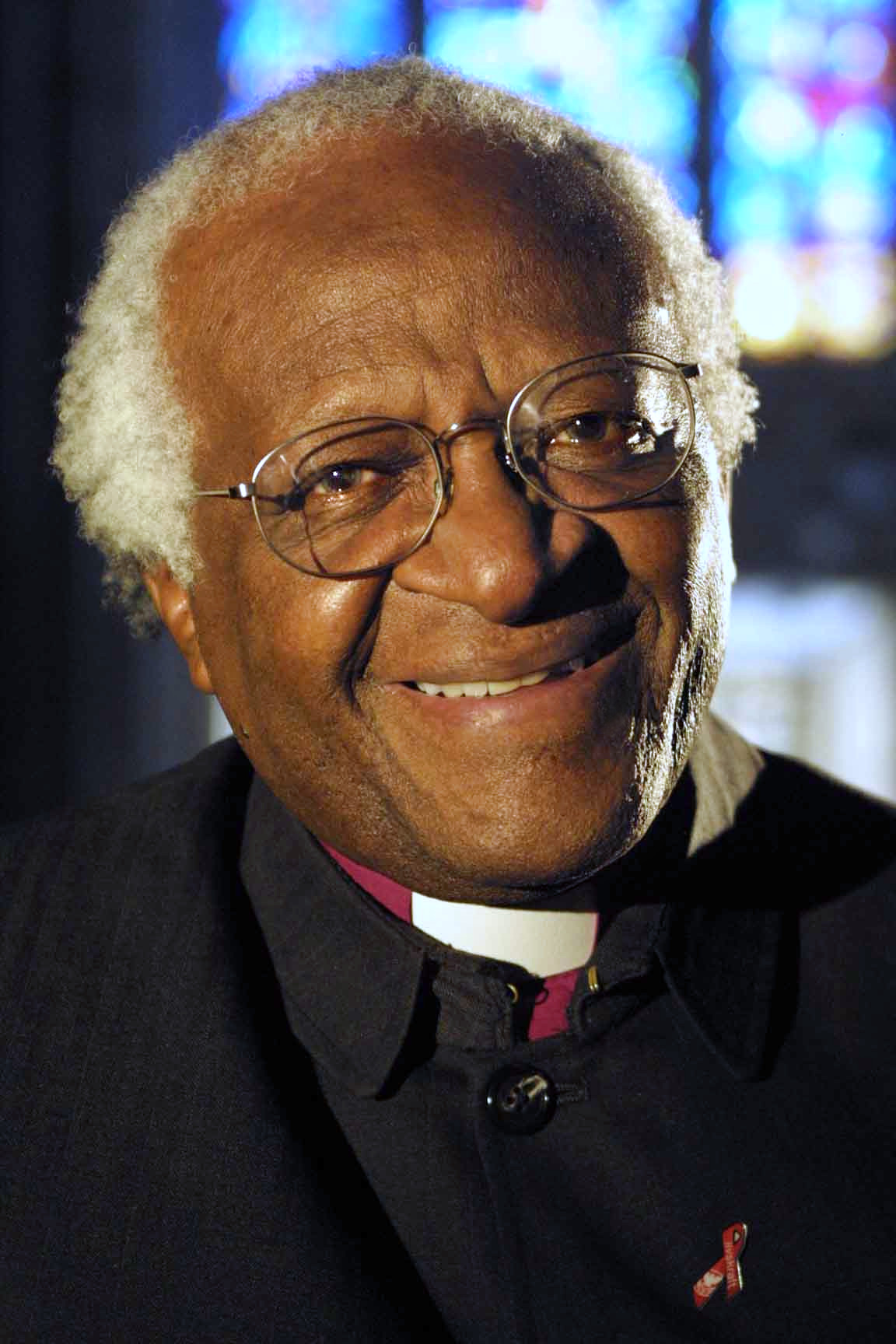
Desmond Tutu (1931–2021), former Primate of the Anglican Church of the Province of South Africa, noted pacifist and a leading figure in the successful fight against apartheid

Some Anglican parishes in the then-Cape Colony refused to join the Church of the Province of South Africa when it was constituted in 1870; these parishes constituted themselves as the Church of England in South Africa (CESA). CESA has subsequently renamed itself as the Reformed Evangelical Anglican Church of South Africa.

Desmond Tutu rose to worldwide fame during the 1980s as an opponent of apartheid. Tutu was elected and ordained the first black South African Anglican Archbishop of Cape Town and primate of the Anglican Church of Southern Africa. He received the Nobel Peace Prize in 1984, the Albert Schweitzer Prize for Humanitarianism, and the Magubela prize for liberty in 1986.

In 2006, the name Church of the Province of Southern Africa was dropped as the name was confusing to some people. The church was renamed the Anglican Church of Southern Africa.

In July 2012, Ellinah Wamukoya of the Anglican Church of Southern Africa became the bishop-elect of Swaziland and the first woman to be elected a bishop in any of the twelve Anglican provinces in Africa. She was consecrated on 17 November 2012 at All Saints Cathedral, Mbabane. On 19 January 2013, Margaret Vertue was consecrated the diocesan bishop of False Bay.

== Organisation ==
The polity of the Anglican Church of Southern Africa is episcopal, like that of other Anglican churches. The church maintains a system of geographical parishes organized into dioceses. The province is divided into various dioceses, each led by its own bishop.

=== Dioceses ===
Diocese	Bishop	Territory	Cathedral	Founded
Cape Town	Thabo Makgoba (Archbishop); Joshua Louw (suffragan Bishop of Table Bay)	Cape Town and nearer suburbs, and Tristan da Cunha	St George's Cathedral, Cape Town	1847
Christ the King	Mkhuseli Sobantwana	Vaal Triangle and southern suburbs of Johannesburg		1990 (from Johannesburg)
False Bay	Stafford Moses	Southeastern suburbs of Cape Town, Stellenbosch, the Overberg and the Breede River Valley		2005 (from Cape Town)
Free State	Dintoe Stephen Letloenyane	Free State province	Cathedral of St Andrew and St Michael, Bloemfontein	1863 (from Cape Town, as Diocese of Bloemfontein)
George	Edwin Pockpass	Garden Route, Little Karoo, Langkloof and Great Karoo	St Mark's Cathedral, George	1911 (from Cape Town)
Grahamstown	Mcebisi Pinyana	Area of Albany, Ciskei, King William's Town and East London in the Eastern Cape	Cathedral of St Michael and St George, Grahamstown	1853 (from Cape Town)
Highveld	Charles May	East Rand and southern Mpumalanga	St Dunstan's Cathedral, Benoni	1990 (from Johannesburg, as Diocese of South Eastern Transvaal)
Johannesburg	Sepadi Moruthane	Central Johannesburg, its northern suburbs and the West Rand	St Mary's Cathedral, Johannesburg	1922 (from Pretoria)
Kimberley and Kuruman	Brian Marajh	Northeastern half of Northern Cape, western part of North West	St Cyprian's Cathedral, Kimberley	1911 (from Bloemfontein, Cape Town and Grahamstown)
Lesotho	Molemo Edwin Baatjies	Lesotho	Cathedral of St Mary and St James, Maseru	1950 (from Free State, as Diocese of Basutoland)
Matlosane	Molopi Diseko	Central part of North West	Cathedral of the Resurrection, Ikageng	1990 (from Johannesburg, as Diocese of Klerksdorp)
Mbhashe	Mluleki Fikizolo	Southern part of the former Transkei, around Butterworth and Ngcobo	All Saints Church, Ngcobo	2010 (from Mthatha)
Mpumalanga	Wayne Saldanha	Northern Mpumalanga province		2004 (from Pretoria)
Mthatha	Vacant	Central part of the former Transkei, around Mthatha and Port St Johns	St John's Cathedral, Mthatha	1872 (from Grahamstown and Natal, as Diocese of St John's)
Namibia	Patrick Djuulume	Namibia	St George's Cathedral, Windhoek	1924 (as Diocese of Damaraland)
Natal	Vacant	KwaZulu-Natal southwest of the Buffalo and Tugela Rivers	Cathedral of the Holy Nativity, Pietermaritzburg	1853 (from Cape Town)
Port Elizabeth	Grant Walters	Western part of the Eastern Cape, from Port Elizabeth to Colesberg	St Mary's Cathedral, Port Elizabeth	1970 (from Grahamstown)
Pretoria	Vicentia Kgabe	Northern part of Gauteng and northeastern part of North West	St Alban's Cathedral, Pretoria	1878 (from Bloemfontein)
St Helena	Dale Bowers	Saint Helena and Ascension Island	Saint Paul's Cathedral, Saint Helena	1859 (from Cape Town)
St Mark the Evangelist	Leonard Nyakale	Limpopo province	Christ Church Cathedral, Polokwane	1987 (from Pretoria)
Saldanha Bay	Raphael Hess	Northern suburbs of Cape Town, the Swartland, the West Coast and Namaqualand		2005 (from Cape Town)
Swaziland	Dalcy Badeli Dlamini	Eswatini	All Saints Cathedral, Mbabane	1968 (from Zululand)
Ukhahlamba	Siyabonga Sibeko	North-central part of the Eastern Cape, from Queenstown to Aliwal North	Cathedral of St. Michael, Queenstown	2009 (from Grahamstown)
Umzimvubu	Phumzile Cetywayo	Griqualand East and the northeastern part of the former Transkei		1991 (from Mthatha)
Zululand	Vikinduku Mnculwane	KwaZulu-Natal northeast of the Buffalo and Tugela Rivers	Cathedral of St Michael and All Angels, Eshowe	1870 (from Natal)

=== Angola and Mozambique ===
At its Autumn 2020 meeting the provincial standing committee approved a plan to form the dioceses which were part of the Anglican Church of Southern Africa in Mozambique and Angola into a separate autonomous province of the Anglican Communion, to be named the Anglican Church of Mozambique and Angola Igreja Anglicana de Moçambique e Angola (IAMA). The plans were also outlined to the Mozambique and Angola Anglican Association (MANNA) at its September 2020 annual general meeting.

The new province would be Portuguese-speaking, and would initially consist of twelve dioceses - four formed out of the existing diocese of Angola, plus eight formed out of the existing three dioceses in Mozambique. The plan has also received the consent of the bishops and diocesan synods of all four existing dioceses in the two nations.

The Anglican Church of Mozambique and Angola was formally inaugurated on 24 September 2021, in an online teleconference.

There are more than 800 Anglican church congregations in Angola and Mozambique, and the new province would have an initial membership of approximately half a million people.

== Liturgy and prayer books ==
The Anglican Church in Southern Africa has used the following prayer books:

- The 1662 English Book of Common Prayer
- An Alternative Form of the Calendar and Occasional Offices of the Church Set forth by Authority for Use in the Church of the Province of South Africa Where Allowed by the Bishop. London: S.P.C.K. 1946.
- A Book of Common Prayer. London and Cape Town: Oxford University Press and S.P.C.K. 1954.
- The Holy Eucharist morning & evening prayer, 1975. Johannesburg (South Africa): C.P.S.A. 1975. ISBN 0868810037.
- An Anglican Prayer Book. Collins Liturgical Publications. 1989. ISBN 978-0-00-599180-0.

The Anglican church was a product of the English Reformation and political contexts of the sixteenth century. Thomas Cranmer, Archbishop of Canterbury, was instrumental in determining the form Anglicanism was to take, not by writing confessional statements or significant theological treaties, but through his authoring of the Book of Common Prayer in 1549 and 1552. All expressions of Anglicanism forever after defined itself in relation to the concept of the Prayer Book, whether being faithful to the Reformed tradition or seeking different approaches. Other denominations have found unity in confessional documents, or doctrinal formularies, or a systematically articulated theology, or the pronouncements of magisterial authorities.

When the work of revising the liturgy in the twentieth century was undertaken it was with the understanding that it was touching the nerve-centre of the Anglican ethos, since Anglican identity takes a more intangible form, deeply dependent upon the influence and binding effect of its liturgical worship. The most recent revision of the Prayer Book resulted in the publishing of An Anglican Prayer Book (1989). The Anglican Prayer Book stands alongside the South African Book of Common Prayer (1954). Both the 1989 and 1954 prayer books have the English 1662 Book of Common Prayer as a common source.

The work of the revision reflected the worldwide liturgical renewal, most notably in relation to the Roman Catholic Church as a result of decisions reached at its Second Vatican Council. Another influence was the charismatic renewal, which has had a marked impact on the Anglican Church of Southern Africa. Particular care was taken to meet evangelical concerns in a Province that is historically High Church rather than Low Church in its main emphasis. Theological breadth – catholic, evangelical, charismatic, and liberal – was aimed at in order to achieve balance and to accommodate these various convictions.

These sensitivities and influences are most evident in the Eucharistic liturgy. Four Eucharistic prayers are given to accommodate different theological preferences. Two are taken from the Church of England, one is borrowed with permission from the Roman Catholic Canon, and pride of place is given in the First Eucharistic Prayer to an indigenous product. The influence of the liturgical movement can be seen in the overall structure and language of the Eucharist, including seeking a sense of continuity with the early, apostolic church.

In tracing this line of continuity from the Lord's Table to the Communion Table, a prayer traditionally ascribed to Hippolytus (ca. 215), bishop of Rome, called the Apostolic Tradition, captured the imagination of contemporary liturgists and now appears in the modern liturgical books of different churches both Roman Catholic and Protestant. The opening lines of all four Eucharistic prayers closely mirror the wording of Hippolytus. The fourth Eucharistic prayer most closely maintains the link with the Hippolytus liturgy, but allows slight variation with respect to the wording of "we offer you" and "we bring before you" to accommodate different theological persuasions. This is an example of how the Anglican Church of Southern Africa in making revisions for the 1989 prayer book adopted a more conciliatory approach to the various ecclesiastical factions, foreshadowing the conciliatory context of South African politics in the early 90s in regard to political factions and political change.

== Doctrine and practice ==
There are a wide range of beliefs among Anglicans, from Evangelical to Anglo-Catholic, from liberal to traditional, but what unites Anglicans is common prayer Lex orandi, lex credendi.

The centre of the Anglican Church of Southern Africa's teaching is the life and resurrection of Jesus Christ. The basic teachings of the church, (contained in the catechism), include:

- Jesus died and was resurrected from the dead.
- The Old and New Testaments of the Bible were written by people "under the inspiration of the Holy Spirit". The Apocrypha are additional books that are used in Christian worship.
- The two great and necessary sacraments are Holy Baptism and Holy Eucharist
- Other sacramental rites are confirmation, ordination, marriage, reconciliation of a penitent, and unction.

The threefold sources of authority in Anglicanism are scripture, tradition, and reason. These three sources uphold and critique each other in a dynamic way. This balance of scripture, tradition and reason is traced to the work of Richard Hooker, a sixteenth-century apologist. In Hooker's model, scripture is the primary means of arriving at doctrine and things stated plainly in scripture are accepted as true. Issues that are ambiguous are determined by tradition, which is checked by reason.

The Anglican Church of Southern Africa embraces three orders of ministry: deacon, priest, and bishop. A local variant of the Book of Common Prayer is used. The Church is known for having Anglo-Catholic leanings.

=== Social issues and ecumenical relations ===
==== Ordination of women ====
The Anglican Church of Southern Africa is regarded as the most liberal Anglican province in Africa with respect to the ordination of women and homosexuality. The church ordained the first woman as a deacon in 1985 followed by ordaining three women to the priesthood in 1992. In 2012, the church consecrated Ellinah Wamukoya as the bishop of Swaziland, the first woman to be an Anglican bishop in Africa. Later, the church consecrated Margaret Vertue as bishop of False Bay. In 2014, the church appointed the first woman to lead the provincial residential theological college. In 2021, Vicentia Kgabe was appointed as the bishop of Lesotho, making her the sixth woman to be an Anglican bishop for the continent of Africa.

==== Same-sex unions and LGBT clergy ====
The canon law of the Anglican Church of Southern Africa states that "marriage by divine institution is a lifelong and exclusive union partnership between one man and one woman." The church also does not have an official stance on homosexuality itself. The Church does not allow gay marriage or civil unions but does allow "same-sex relationships if they are celibate." In 2023, the Synod of Bishops agreed that they would "develop prayers of affirmation and acknowledgement" that may be said with same-sex couples. In 1998, the Associated Press reported than an Anglican priest offered a blessing for a same-sex couple in an unofficial ceremony not recognised by the church or by the government at the time. The Diocese of Saldanha Bay has approved of blessing rites for same-sex civil unions. Regarding ordination, the church does not have an official position on the ordination of clergy who identify as gay or lesbian. As examples, in 2003, Rowan Smith, a former dean of St. George's Cathedral, and Douglas Torr, from Johannesburg, came out as gay. An openly gay and celibate bishop, Mervyn Castle, was consecrated in Cape Town. Archbishop Emeritus Ndungane was supportive of the consecration of the first openly partnered gay bishop, Gene Robinson in 2003. Ndungane now supports same-sex marriage blessings. Desmond Tutu, Archbishop Emeritus of Cape Town, affirmed same-sex marriages and church blessings. Thabo Makgoba, the current primate and archbishop, was quoted as being "one among few church leaders in Africa to support same-sex marriage."

The Diocese of Cape Town, after a synod in 2009, passed a resolution calling the bishops of the church to give pastoral guidelines for homosexual couples who lived in "covenanted relationships." The resolution agreed to "Affirming a pastoral response to same-sex partnerships of faithful commitment in our parish families." It also approved an amendment to the resolution that the guidelines give "due regard of the mind of the Anglican Communion." In 2009 the synod declared that "[g]ays and lesbians can be leaders within the Anglican Church of Southern Africa as long as they remain celibate". The Diocese of False Bay has also been supportive of LGBTI people celebrating the ministry of a gay priest. Mervyn Castle, who is openly gay, was consecrated as bishop of False Bay by Desmond Tutu, the then archbishop of Cape Town in 1994. The Diocese of False Bay removed a priest for anti-gay views in 2011. In 2013, the Provincial Synod, governing the church, adopted a resolution that "urged its bishops to provide guidelines for giving pastoral care to same-sex couples who have entered civil unions under South African law." The resolution "request[s] the Synod of Bishops to work towards finalising the Guidelines for pastoral ministry in response to Civil Unions as soon as possible." The resolution says that it "affirms" in "2.1 That God calls us to love and minister to all people, regardless of their sexual orientation, while at the same time upholding God's standards of holiness; 2.2 That this is a highly complex and emotive area which affects many people deeply and has a far reaching impact on the mission of the Church."

In December 2015, Canon Mpho Tutu, the daughter of Desmond Tutu, married her female partner in a civil ceremony in the Netherlands. In 2016, the Revd Charlotte Bannister-Parker, a Church of England priest, presided with her bishop's permission over a service of celebration, and Archbishop Tutu was able to give a blessing for his daughter and her partner. Tutu decided to surrender her licence in South Africa to avoid controversy, but remained a priest of the Episcopal Diocese of Washington D.C. in the USA. Bishop Raphael Hess, of Saldanha Bay, supporting same-sex unions, is seeking to change church policy to allow her to serve. The bishops discussed the issue in February 2016. The official statement said that the church "cannot advise the legitimizing or blessing of same-sex unions nor ordaining those involved in same-gender unions". Makgoba also said "we also tried at the Synod of Bishops to draw up guidelines for clergy wanting to bless couples in same-sex unions, or who want to enter same-sex unions themselves...[but] on this issue, I had to report back...that we were not of one mind." The bishops also affirmed members in same-gender marriages as full and equal members of the Church. The message was "that gay, lesbian and transgendered members of our church share in full membership as baptised members of the Body of Christ." In August 2016, the Diocese of Saldanha Bay proposed that the church bless same-gender unions and permit LGBTI priests to marry. A motion to this effect was put the Provincial Synod meeting in September 2016; The voting was as follows:

House	For	Against	Total	% In Favour
Laity	25	41	66	37.9%
Clergy	34	42	76	44.7%
Bishops	6	16	22	27.3%
Total	65	99	164	39.6%

Archbishop Makgoba "added that 'all is not lost.' He said the issue might hopefully be taken up again at the next Provincial Synod in 2019...He also said the issue could be discussed at the local level in parishes and dioceses." Makgoba further added "I was deeply pained by the outcome of the debate." After the vote, priests in Saldanha Bay declared they would bless same-gender marriages individually. At least one priest, who is in a same-sex relationship, has said the church ordained him knowing of his relationship.

On 2 March 2017, the bench of bishops stated that they are working on "pastoral guidelines for ministry to those in same-sex relationships, which are still incomplete. [The bishops] asked Archbishop Thabo to set up a small group of bishops to work on completing them, together with others who could help the process." Archbishop Ndungane also advocated for a same-sex blessing rite. Archbishop Thabo Makgoba set up a working group ".... to amend Canon 34 which will enable ministry to those in Same Sex Unions and the LGBTI Community in the context in which ACSA operates in Southern Africa." In 2019, the Provincial Synod voted to establish a permanent commission on human sexuality and to send a report to dioceses, for "reflection and study," that recommends allowing each diocese to choose whether to offer services of prayer following a same-sex civil union during a trial period; a third motion to request that bishops develop guidelines for pastoral ministry to LGBTQ persons was deadlocked, and did not pass, in a vote of 75 in favour to 75 against. In 2022, the Bishops of the Dioceses of Lesotho, False Bay, and Saldanha Bay signed a statement expressing support for the inclusion of LGBTQ people in the Anglican Communion. In 2023, the Archbishop's Commission on Human Sexuality proposed allowing clergy to bless same-sex civil unions. In March, 2023, the Synod of Bishops rejected proposals to bless or marry same-sex couples, but they did agree to craft "prayers of affirmation and acknwoledgement for all faithful Anglicans who are in civil unions" that could be said pastorally with same-sex couples. On April 25, 2024, the church published the draft prayers to be said with couples in same-sex unions for study. The drafted prayers include both blessings for same-sex couples and prayers acknowledging disagreement with same-sex relationships. A motion, supported by Thabo Makgoba, and other bishops, to authorise the published prayers for use was rejected in a vote by the Provincial Synod.

In 2024, Raphael Hess, the bishop of the Diocese of Saldanha Bay, permitted clergy in the diocese to bless same-sex couples following the synod. In September, 2026, the Provincial Synod considered two motions on offering prayers of support or formal liturgies to bless same-sex couples. The first motion, asking for prayers to be said with couples, failed, receiving 78 votes against, 71 in favour, and 10 abstentions; the second motion, asking for an "alternative liturgy" for same-sex couples failed, receiving 98 votes against, 61 in favour, and 10 abstentions.

==== Ecumenical relations ====
The Anglican Church of Southern Africa is a member of the ecumenical World Council of Churches.

== Relation with the Anglican Communion conflicts and realignment ==
South Africa's Anglican church has a more liberal tradition that sets it apart from its more conservative African counterparts. The province has been associated with the most liberal Anglican provinces concerning homosexuality and the acceptance of same-sex unions, such as the United States, Canada, Brazil, New Zealand, Scotland, Wales and South India.

The Anglican Church of Southern Africa, although described geographically as a part of the Global South, is not a member of the Global South Fellowship of Anglicans (GSFA). Moderate conservative Bishop Johannes Seoka, of the Anglican Diocese of Pretoria, represented the province at the Global South Fourth Encounter that took place in Singapore on 19–23 April 2010 and at their subsequent meeting in Bangkok, Thailand, on 18–20 July 2012. The ACSA adopted the Anglican Communion Covenant proposed by the then Archbishop of Canterbury, Rowan Williams, as a way to preserve the unity of the Anglican Communion at their provincial synod held in 2010 and ratified the decision at their following meeting in October 2013. At the same time, Archbishop Thabo Makgoba emphasised his province's role of "being at the heart of Anglican life, often acting as a bridge-builder, and drawing on its own experiences of living with considerable diversity and wrestling with difference."

Bethlehem Nopece, Bishop of Port Elizabeth, has been the leading name of the Anglican realignment in the province since he strongly opposed the consecration of partnered homosexual Gene Robinson as a bishop of the Episcopal Church in 2003. Nopece was the only bishop of the ACSA to have attended the Global Anglican Future Conference that took place in Jerusalem on 23–28 June 2008. He decided the following year to launch the Fellowship of Confessing Anglicans in South Africa after the resolution on 22 August 2009 of the Anglican Diocese of Cape Town to pass pastoral guidelines to members of the church who live in same-sex unions. Nopece presided at the launching of the Fellowship of Confessing Anglicans at St. John's Church, Port Elizabeth, on 3 September 2009, with the presence of a retired Anglican Archbishop of Kenya, Benjamin Nzimbi. The event was greeted with messages of support from some of the leading names of the Anglican realignment, archbishops Peter Akinola of the Church of Nigeria, Peter Jensen of the Anglican Diocese of Sydney, Robert Duncan of the Anglican Church in North America and Bishop Michael Nazir-Ali of the Church of England. Nopece led a 10 members delegation, which included Bishop Nathaniel Nakwatumbah of the Anglican Diocese of Namibia, to the GAFCON II that took place at Nairobi, Kenya, on 21–26 October 2013. Bishop Nopece led once again the province's delegation to GAFCON III, held in Jerusalem, on 17–22 June 2018, comprised by 18 members, 16 from South Africa, Bishop Vicente Msosa, of the Anglican Diocese of Niassa, as the only delegate from Mozambique, and another one from Namibia.
