= San Leonardo da Porto Maurizio ad Acilia =

San Leonardo da Porto Maurizio
- St. Leonard of Port Maurice (in English); S. Leonardi a Porto Maurizio ad Acilia (in Latin)
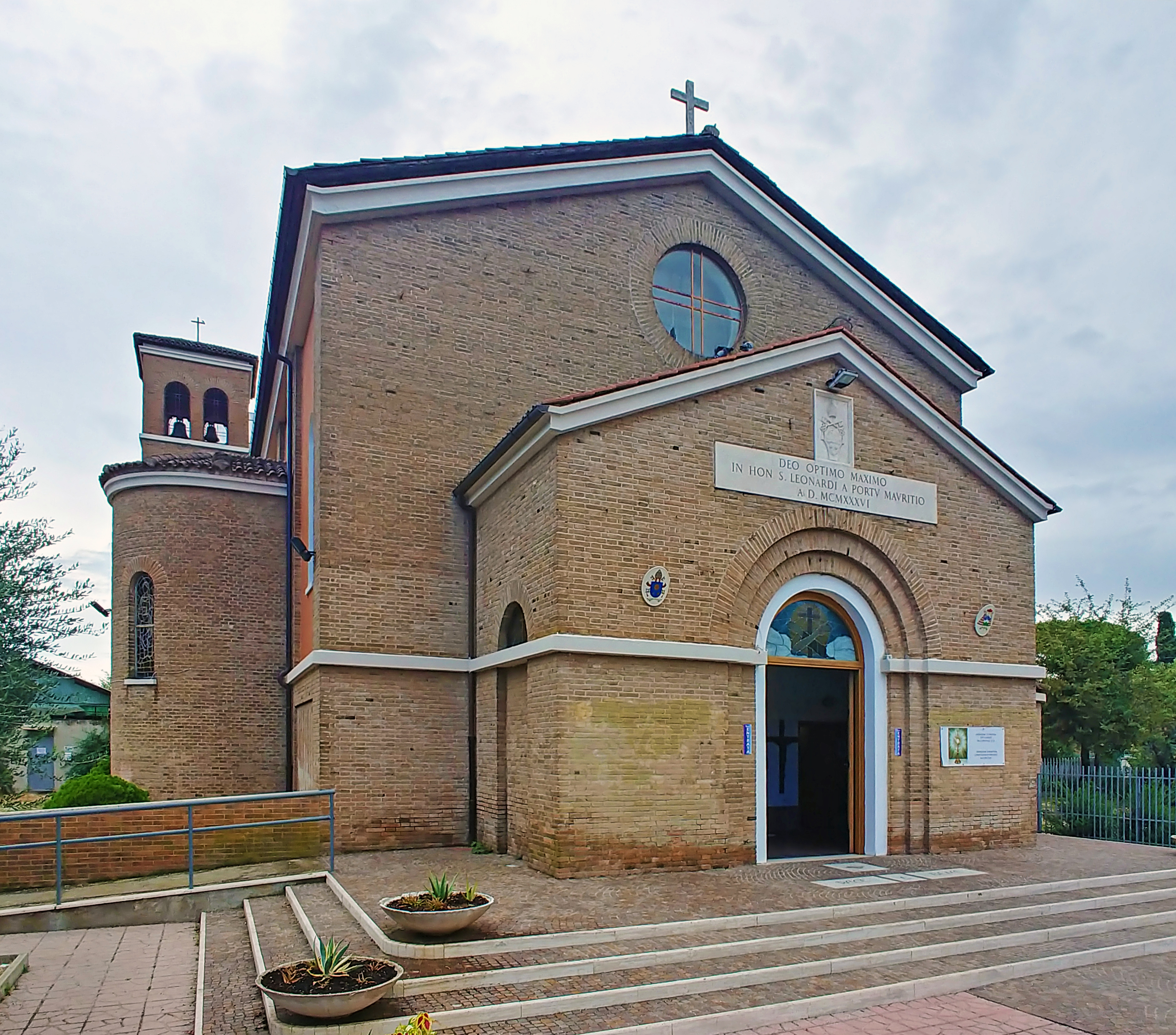
- Facade
- Click on the map for a fullscreen view
- 41°47′00″N 12°21′58″E
- Location: Via Ludovico Antomelli 1, Acilia, Rome
- Country: Italy
- Denomination: Roman Catholic
- Tradition: Latin Church

History
- Status: Titular church
- Dedication: Leonard of Port Maurice

Architecture
- Architectural type: Church

Administration
- District: Lazio
- Province: Rome

The church of San Leonardo da Porto Maurizio ad Acilia is a church in Rome located at Acilia District, dedicated to Leonard of Port Maurice.

Pope Francis instituted this church as a seat of the cardinal title of S. Leonardo da Porto Maurizio.

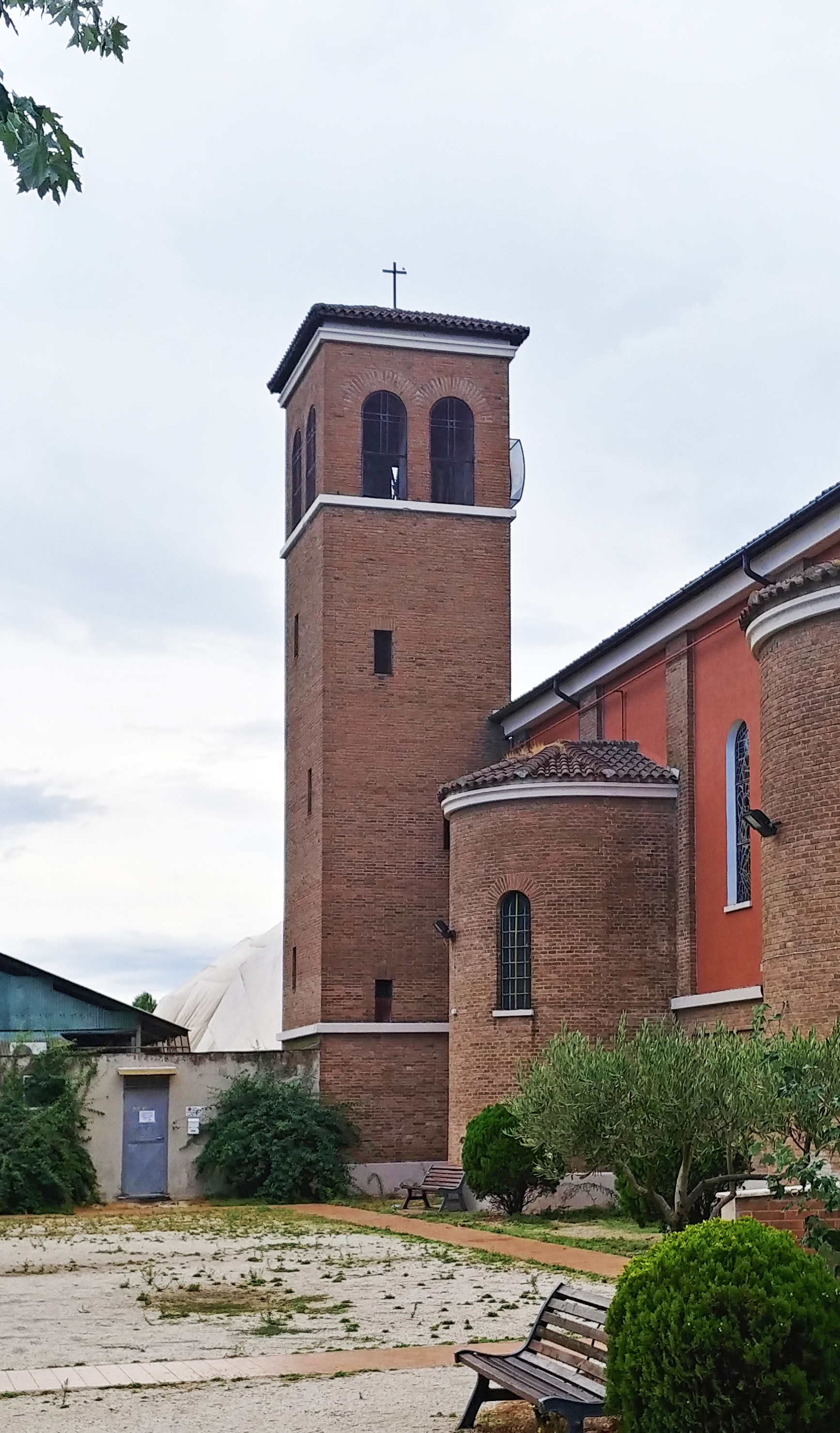
Campanile

== List of Cardinal Protectors ==
- Sebastian Koto Khoarai 19 November 2016 - 17 April 2021
- Leonardo Ulrich Steiner 27 August 2022 - present
