= Elliot Williams (bishop) =

Sebenzile Elliot Williams is a South African Anglican bishop: since 2010 he has been the inaugural Bishop of Mbhashe.

== Notes ==
Anglican Church of Southern Africa titles
| New diocese | Bishop of Mbhashe; 2011–2021 | Succeeded by Mluleki Fikizolo |
