= John Maund (bishop) =

Anglican Bishop of Lesotho from 1950 to 1976

John Arthur Arrowsmith Maund (19 October 1909 – 1998) was the first Anglican Bishop of Lesotho from 1950 until 1976.

== Personal life ==
Maund was born in Worcester to Arthur Arrowsmith Maund, and died in Malvern, Worcestershire. He was educated at Leeds University and, after a period of study at the College of the Resurrection, Mirfield, was ordained in 1934.

== Clerical career ==
His first post was as a Curate at All Saints and St Laurence, Evesham after which he emigrated to South Africa to work at the Pretoria Native Mission. When World War II came he served as a Chaplain to the Forces and was mentioned in despatches. After peace returned he was at the St Peter′s parish in Lady Selborne, Pretoria before his appointment to the episcopate.

In retirement he continued to serve the church as an assistant bishop within the Diocese of St Edmundsbury and Ipswich.

Anglican Church of Southern Africa titles
New title	Bishop of Lesotho; 1950–1976	Succeeded by Desmond Tutu
