= Diocese of Mpumalanga =

Location
- Ecclesiastical province: Southern Africa

Statistics
- Parishes: 22

Information
- Rite: Anglican

Current leadership
- Bishop: Vacant

Website
- www.mpumalanga.anglican.org

The Anglican Diocese of Mpumalanga is a diocese in the Anglican Church of Southern Africa. The Diocese of Mpumalanga, as the name suggests, spans the northern section of the South African province of Mpumalanga, while the Diocese of the Highveld covers the southern section. The diocese comprises four archdeaconries and 22 parishes.

== History ==
Formerly part of the Diocese of Pretoria, the Diocese of Mpumalanga was founded on 6 June 2004. The first synod meetings were held on 23 July and 22 October 2005, then again on 18 March 2006. The diocesan visioning process was launched on 15 October 2006. The first clergy school was held in February 2007.

Les Walker was the first bishop of the newly formed Diocese. Before his election he served as Dean of St Alban's Cathedral in the Diocese of Pretoria. He was consecrated bishop on 5 February 2005 in the Cathedral of St Alban the Martyr, Pretoria, and enthroned as bishop of the new diocese on 12 February 2005. Walker died on 20 November 2009. He was succeeded by Daniel Kgomosotho.

Arms of the Diocese of Mpumalanga

== List of bishops ==
- Les Walker (2005–2009)
- Dan Kgomosotho (2010–2026)
- Wayne Saldanha 2026 -
