= Evaristus Thatho Bitsoane =

Bishop of the Roman Catholic Diocese of Qacha's Nek, Lesotho

- Bishop of Qacha’s Nek
- Church: Catholic Church
- Diocese: Diocese of Qacha's Nek
- In office: 17 July 1981 – 17 July 2010
- Predecessor: Joseph-Delphis Des Rosiers
- Successor: Joseph Mopeli Sephamola

Orders
- Ordination: 19 December 1964 by Gregorio Pietro Agagianian
- Consecration: 11 October 1981 by Alfonso Liguori Morapeli

Personal details
- Born: 17 September 1938
- Died: 17 July 2010 (aged 71)

Evaristus Thatho Bitsoane (17 September 1938 – 17 July 2010) was the Roman Catholic bishop of the Roman Catholic Diocese of Qacha's Nek, Lesotho.

Ordained to the priesthood on 19 December 1964, for the Qacha's Nek Diocese, Bitsoane was appointed bishop of the diocese on 17 July 1981, and was ordained on 11 October 1981. He died in office.
