= Mluleki Fikizolo =

Anglican Bishop of Mbhashe

The Right Reverend Mluleki Fikizolo is the current Anglican Bishop of Mbhashe.

Anglican Church of Southern Africa titles
Preceded by Sebenzile Elliot Williams	Bishop of Mbhashe; 2021–	Incumbent
