= Diocese of False Bay =

Anglican Diocese in South Africa

Diocese of False Bay Bisdom van Valsbaai Idayosisi yase False Bay
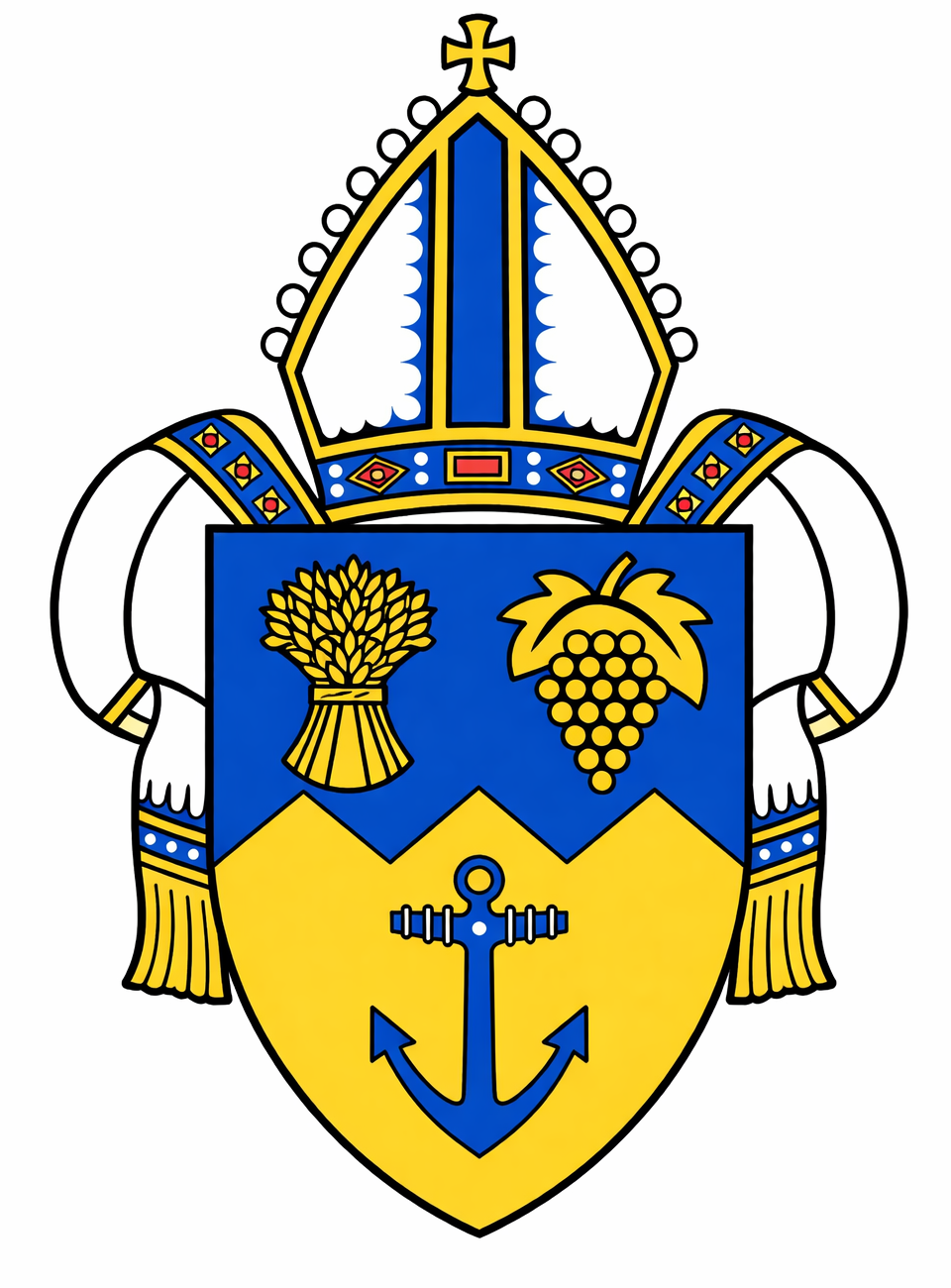
- Coat of Arms of the Diocese of False Bay

Location
- Country: South Africa
- Archdeaconries: Bluedowns, Breede Valley, Helderberg, Mitchells Plain, Mountain Bay, Overberg
- Coordinates: 34°4′59″S 18°50′55″E

Statistics
- Parishes: 50

Information
- Denomination: Anglican
- Established: 2005
- Cathedral: All Saints Cathedral, Somerset West

Current leadership
- Bishop: The Rt Revd Stafford Moses

The Diocese of False Bay is a diocese in the Anglican Church of Southern Africa. It was created when the Anglican Diocese of Cape Town was split into three divisions, namely the Diocese of Table Bay, the Diocese of Saldanha Bay and the Diocese of False Bay. The Diocese was officially inaugurated on the first Advent Sunday in 2005. It comprises 50 parishes in six archdeaconries.

== List of bishops ==
- Merwyn Edwin Castle (2006-2013)
- Margaret Vertue (2013-2023)
- Stafford Moses (2024-)

== Sources ==
- Desmond Tutu: Rabble-Rouser for Peace, by John Allen
