= Molopi Diseko =

Molopi Diseko is a South African Anglican bishop. He has been the Bishop of Matlosane since 2007.

Diseko was educated at the Lelapa La Jesu Seminary in Lesotho, the College of the Resurrection at Mirfield and the University of the North West, Potchefstroom. He was ordained deacon in 1990 and to the priesthood the following year. In 2004, as parish priest of the Church of the Resurrection, Ikageng, he became the first Dean of the newly inaugurated Cathedral of the Resurrection. On 1 May 2007 he was consecrated as the second Bishop of the Diocese of Matlosane

== Notes ==
Anglican Church of Southern Africa titles
Preceded by David Nkwe	Bishop of Matlosane; 2018 –	Incumbent
