= All Saints Cathedral, Mbabane =

Church in Mbabane, Eswatini

Coordinates: 26.196°S 31.089°E

All Saints Cathedral is a religious building that is affiliated with the Anglican Church of South Africa and is located at Fiddes Street in the city of Mbabane the capital and largest city in Eswatini. It was extended in 1993.
