= Raphael Hess =

Anglican bishop from South Africa

Raphael Hess is an Anglican bishop: since 2006 he has been the inaugural Bishop of Saldanha Bay. Hess is an advocate for the blessing of same-sex couples and the inclusion of LGBTQ clergy in the Anglican Church of Southern Africa. In 2018, Hess and the Diocese of Saldanha Bay endorsed proposals to develop rites of blessing for same-sex couples. In 2024, he gave permission for clergy in the diocese to bless same-sex couples locally.
