= Diocese of Matlosane =

The Diocese of Matlosane (formerly the Diocese of Klerksdorp) is a diocese of the Anglican Church of Southern Africa. The diocese was founded in 1990, divided from the Anglican Diocese of Johannesburg. It occupies the central part of the North West province in South Africa.

== List of bishops ==
- 1990–2006: David Nkwe
- 2007–present: Molopi Diseko

== Coat of arms ==
Arms of the Diocese of Matlosane

The diocese registered arms at the Bureau of Heraldry in 1989 : Vert, a chevron rompu Or and in base an Agnus Dei proper; the shield ensigned of an episcopal mitre, also proper.
