= Gerard Tlali Lerotholi =

The Most Reverend Gerard Tlali Lerotholi O.M.I.
- Archbishop of Maseru
- Church: Roman Catholic Church
- Archdiocese: Maseru
- See: Maseru
- Appointed: 30 June 2009
- Predecessor: Bernard Mohlalisi
- Other post: President of the Lesothan Episcopal Conference (2011-)

Orders
- Ordination: 3 January 1982
- Consecration: 12 September 2009 by Bernard Mohlalisi

Personal details
- Born: Gerard Tlali Lerotholi; 12 February 1954 (age 72) Mokhotlong, Lesotho
- Education: Pontifical Gregorian University; Pontifical Biblical Institute

Gerard Tlali Lerotholi O.M.I. (born 12 February 1954) is a Mosotho prelate of the Roman Catholic Church who has been Archbishop of Maseru, Lesotho, since 2009.

== Biography ==
Gerard Tlali Lerotholi was born on 12 February 1954 in the mission of St. James in the Diocese of Qacha's Nek. His family belongs to the lineage of the royal family of Lesotho. He entered the novitiate of the Missionary Oblates of Mary Immaculate at Quthing in 1975. He studied philosophy at the St. Augustine's Major Seminary in Roma and theology at the Pontifical Gregorian University. He earned his Licentiate in Sacred Scripture at the Pontifical Biblical Institute. He made his perpetual vows in 1981 and was ordained a priest in 1982.

From 1982 to 1987 he was Professor at St. Augustine's Major Seminary. From 1987 to 1995 he worked toward a doctorate in sacred theology at St. Paul University in Ottawa, Canada. From 1995 to 1999 he was an assistant at an O.M.I. formation house in Canada. From 1999 to 2009 he held the title Professor at the National University of Lesotho while serving as a member of the University Superior Council, Superior of the Pius XII College House, Professor at St. Augustine's Seminary, and Catholic Chaplain of the National University.

On 30 June 2009, Pope Benedict XVI named him Archbishop of Maseru. He received his episcopal consecration on 12 September from his predecessor Archbishop Bernard Mohlalisi. Benedict presented him with his pallium, his symbol of office as a metropolitan archbishop, on 29 June 2010.

In October 2009 at the Synod of Bishops' special assembly for Africa, he described how elections in Lesotho were often followed by social unrest as the results were disputed and that "the Lesotho Christian Council of Churches is asked to mediate" and it is "often the Catholic Church which plays the most important part in resolving conflict in Lesotho".

As president of the Lesotho Episcopal Conference, he participated in the Synod on the Family in 2014 and 2015.

Pope Francis appointed him a member of the Pontifical Council for Culture on 11 November 2019.
