= Diocese of Saldanha Bay =

The Diocese of Saldanha Bay is a diocese in the Anglican Church of Southern Africa.

The diocese was founded on 10 December 2005 and is based in the territory of the Diocese of Cape Town. Previously the area was served by a Regional Bishop of Saldanha within the Diocese of Cape Town, one of whom was Justus Marcus.

The Diocese was the first in the Anglican Church of Southern Africa to approve of the blessing of same-sex civil unions. In 2024, Raphael Hess, the bishop of the Diocese, gave permission for priests to bless same-sex couples.

== List of bishops ==
- Raphael Hess 2006–present

== Sources ==
- Desmond Tutu: Rabble-Rouser for Peace, by John Allen
