= Grant Walters =

Anglican Bishop of Port Elizabeth

The Right Reverend Grant Walters is the current Anglican Bishop of Port Elizabeth.
