= Stafford Moses =

Anglican Bishop of False Bay

The Right Reverend Stanfford Moses is the current Anglican Bishop of False Bay
