= Leonardo Ulrich Steiner =

Brazilian Catholic cardinal (born 1950)

His Eminence Leonardo Ulrich Steiner O.F.M.
- Archbishop of Manaus
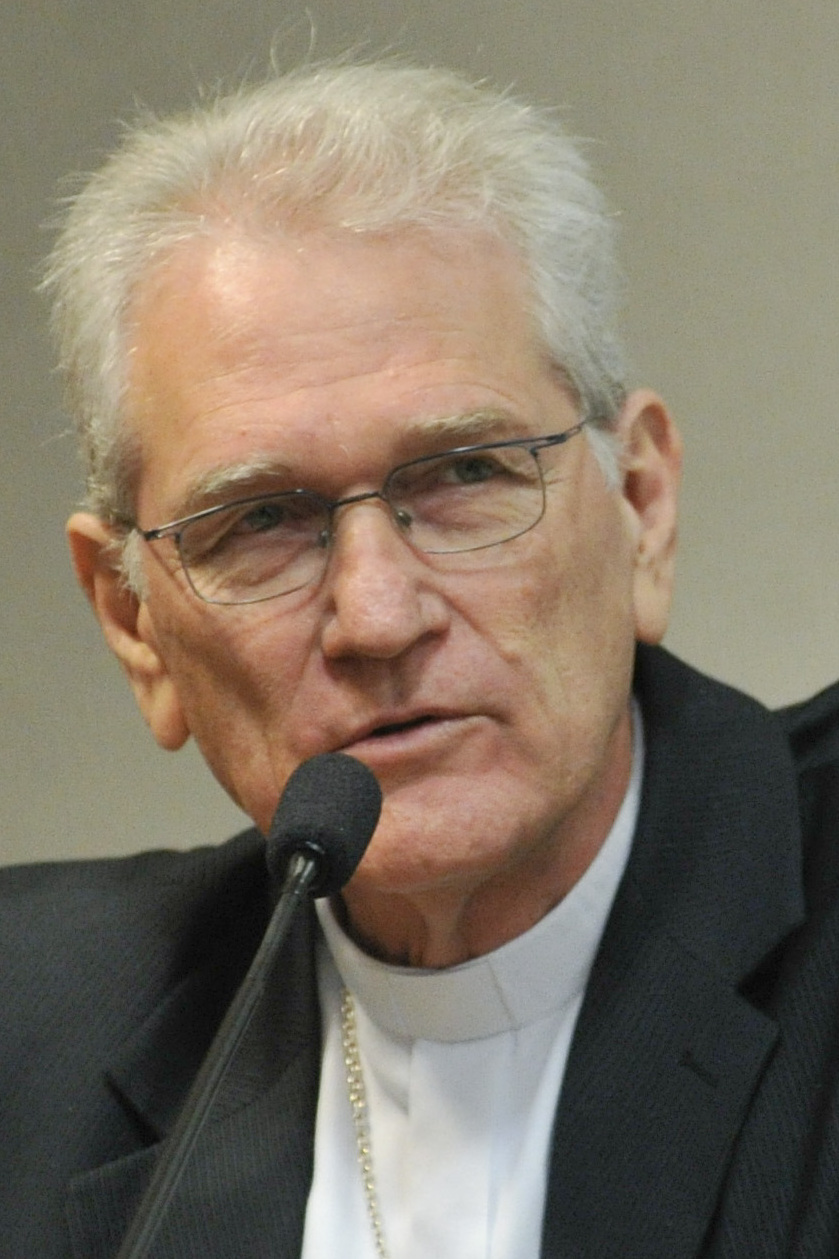
- Church: Roman Catholic Church
- Appointed: 27 November 2019
- Installed: 31 January 2020
- Predecessor: Sérgio Eduardo Castriani
- Other post: Cardinal Priest of San Leonardo da Porto Maurizio ad Acilia (2022–present)
- Previous posts: Bishop Prelate of São Félix (2005–2011); Titular Bishop of Thisiduo (2011–2019); Auxiliary Bishop of Brasília (2011–2019)

Orders
- Ordination: 21 January 1978 by Paulo Evaristo Arns
- Consecration: 16 April 2005 by Paulo Evaristo Arns
- Created cardinal: 27 August 2022 by Pope Francis
- Rank: Cardinal priest

Personal details
- Born: 6 November 1950 (age 75) Forquilhinha, Brazil
- Motto: Verbum caro factum
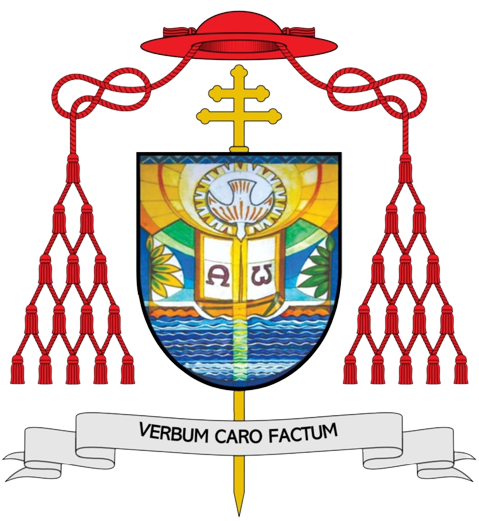
- Coat of arms

Styles of Leonardo Ulrich Steiner
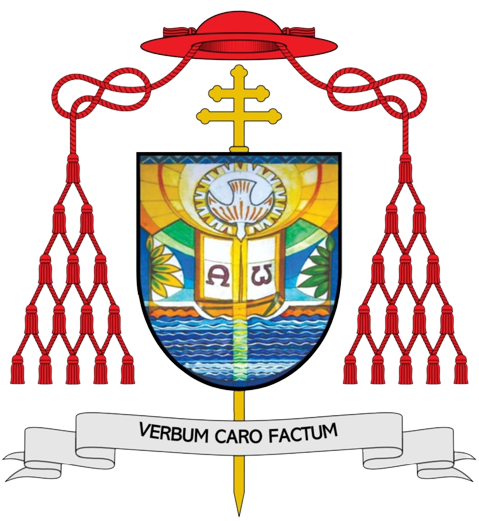
- Reference style: His Eminence
- Spoken style: Your Eminence
- Religious style: Cardinal
- Informal style: Cardinal

Leonardo Ulrich Steiner OFM (born 6 November 1950) is a Brazilian Catholic prelate who has served as Archbishop of Manaus since 2020. A member of the Order of Friars Minor since 1976 and a bishop since 2005, he was an auxiliary bishop of the Archdiocese of Brasília from 2011 to 2019.

On 27 August 2022, Pope Francis made Steiner a cardinal, the first from the Amazon region.

== Biography ==
Leonardo Ulrich Steiner was born on 6 November 1950 in Forquilhinha, Santa Catarina, Brazil. He took his vows as a member of the Order of Friars Minor on 2 August 1976 and was ordained a priest on 21 January 1978 by his cousin Cardinal Arns.

He studied philosophy and theology at the Franciscans of Petrópolis. He earned a bachelor's degree in philosophy and pedagogy at the Salesian Faculty of Lorraine. At the Pontifical Athenaeum Antonianum in Rome he obtained a licentiate and a doctorate in philosophy. After a period as assistant pastor and parish priest, he was seminary formator until 1986 and novice master from 1986 to 1995.

From 1995 to 2003 he was Professor of Philosophy and Secretary of the Antonianum. Returning to Brazil in 2003, he was assistant pastor of the Bom Jesus Parish in the Archdiocese of Curitiba, as well as a lecturer at the Bom Jesus Faculty of Philosophy there.

On 2 February 2005, Pope John Paul II appointed him bishop prelate of São Félix. He received his episcopal consecration on 16 April from Cardinal Arns.

On 21 September 2011, Pope Benedict XVI named him titular bishop of Tisiduo and auxiliary bishop of Brasilia.

From May 2011 to May 2019 he was Secretary General of the Episcopal Conference of Brazil.

In the face of the Bolsonaro government's Covid denialism, Steiner avoided verbal confrontation and preferred to let the Church's actions serve as a response. He said: "Such ideological issues are very complex. But the church can't cease to manifest its positions. At the same time, we show through our work what we think that real solidarity is.... [Deniers] have lost sensibility to their neighbor. But the work that Catholics have been doing in Manaus, taking solace and hope to the homeless, immigrants and the poor, is fantastic. That's why our voice will keep being heard."

On 27 November 2019, Pope Francis appointed him archbishop of Manaus. He was installed there on 31 January 2020.

In April 2022 Steiner was named president of the Special Episcopal Commission for the Amazon. He is also the vice president of the Ecclesial Conference of the Amazon Region (CEAMA).

On 27 August 2022, Pope Francis made him a cardinal priest, assigning him the title of San Leonardo da Porto Maurizio ad Acilia.

Steiner participated as a cardinal elector in the 2025 papal conclave. Prior to the conclave, he was considered by a few sources to be papabile—a candidate for the papacy. The conclave ultimately elected Robert Francis Prevost as Pope Leo XIV.

== Personal life ==
Cardinal Paulo Evaristo Arns, Archbishop of São Paulo, was Steiner's cousin.

== See also ==
- Cardinals created by Pope Francis

Catholic Church titles
Preceded by Sérgio Eduardo Castriani	Archbishop of Manaus; 31 January 2020 – present	Incumbent
Order of precedence
Preceded by Geraldo Alckmin as Vice President of Brazil	Brazilian order of precedence 3rd in line as Brazilian cardinal	Followed by Foreign ambassadors
