= Diocese of Mbhashe =

Location
- Country: South Africa
- Ecclesiastical province: Southern Africa
- Metropolitan: Cape Town
- Archdeaconries: 12

Statistics
- Parishes: 51

Information
- Denomination: Anglican
- Cathedral: All Saints Church, Ngcobo

Current leadership
- Bishop: Mluleki Fikizolo

The Diocese of Mbhashe is a diocese of the Anglican Church of Southern Africa situated in the Eastern Cape province of South Africa. It was established on 16 December 2010 out of part of the Diocese of Mthatha. The diocesan cathedral is All Saints Cathedral in Ngcobo, while the diocesan office is in Butterworth. The diocese includes the areas of Cala, Cofimvaba, Dutywa, Elliot, Kentani and Tsomo. The diocese's first bishop was Sebenzile Elliot Williams. The current Bishop is Mluleki Fikizolo.

== List of bishops ==
Bishops of Mbashe
From	Until	Incumbent	Notes
2011	2021	Sebenzile Elliot Williams	
2021		Mluleki Fikizolo	
