= St George's Cathedral, Windhoek =

Church in Windhoek, Namibia

Coordinates: 22°34′13″S 17°5′1″E

St George's Cathedral is an Anglican church in Windhoek, Namibia. The current incumbent is Hugh Prentice. There is a school attached to the cathedral.
