= Casual vacancy (disambiguation) =

Casual vacancy may refer to:

- Casual vacancy, in politics, where a seat in a deliberative assembly becomes vacant during that assembly's term
  - Casual vacancies in the Australian Parliament
- The Casual Vacancy, a 2012 novel by J. K. Rowling
  - The Casual Vacancy (miniseries), based on the book
