= Sesotho poetry =

Sesotho poetry is a form of artistic expression using the written and spoken word practiced by the Basotho people in Southern Africa. Written poetry in the Sesotho language has existed for over 150 years however, the oral poetry has been practiced throughout Basotho history.

== Forms of Sotho poetry ==
The classical form of Sotho oral poetry is called ‘dithoko’. This type of Sotho poetry was inspired by tribal wars and battles fought by the Basotho people. However, urbanisation, a changing economy, and modernism have inspired new forms of poetry to develop in the Sotho culture. The new forms of dithoko include the difela, 'mine workers' chants', and the diboko, the latter which are 'family odes', and are still performed in rural areas of Lesotho and the Free State province of South Africa. Like most other oral forms of poetry, the authors are unknown and poem are passed down from generation to generation.

There is a strong link between Sotho music and Sotho poetry. A Sesotho praise poet characteristically uses assonance and alliteration. Eloquence or ‘bokheleke’ is highly valued in the sotho culture and people who possess this skill are respected. The praise poetry (dithoko) is not a musical form but, it is incorporated in most Sesotho songs.

Praise poetry is highly developed Sotho oral literature and plays a significant role in the study and recording of history as it contains a large amount of information about past significant people and events. Every Sotho king has had a designated praise poet who praised his ancestry and deeds. In addition, the praise poets also praised tribal warriors and national heroes.

A description of a Sotho praise poet by a missionary in the 1800s: ‘During the early part of our sojourn among (the Sotho), we often heard them recite, with very dramatic gestures, certain pieces, which were not easy of comprehension, and which appeared to be distinguished from the ordinary discourse, by the elevation of the sentiment, powerful ellipses, daring metaphors, and very accentuated rhythm. The natives called these recitations praises’

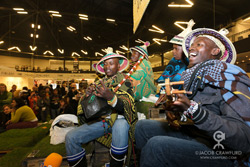
Basotho band Sotho Sounds performing at WOMEX in 2011.

== History ==
Christian missionaries from the 1800s played an important role in publishing Basotho oral poetry through their missionary journal called ‘’Leselinyana la Lesotho’’ (translates ‘little light of Lesotho). Some of the first literary works published by the Sotho people included praise poems and idioms which were accompanied by explanatory notes. Famous publications made during this time included Azriel’s Sekese’s transcriptions of ‘dithoko’’ of Moshoeshoe I between 1893 and 1906 and Mangoaela’s Lithoko tsa marena a Basotho (translates ‘Praise poems of Basotho chiefs’ which started as a series from the 21 November 1919 till 10 June 1921.

With the discovery of diamonds in Kimberley and gold in South Africa in 1866 and 1886 respectively, many mining companies allowed for the migration of Basotho men in order to create a larger labour force. It was during this time that a new form of poetry called difela tsa ditsamayanaha simply known as difela emerged and was recited throughout their journeys to the mines and back to their villages. These journeys were usually by foot and took several weeks, it was during these weeks that Basotho men composed new poems and chanted them throughout their travels. The contents of ‘difela’ mostly consist of stories of economic hardship, exploitation and usually had strong political comments. Difela are most often egocentric and reflect the male migrant existential self-understanding as a contemporary hero. ‘Difela’ often saw themselves as ordinary people who were confronted by the dangers of new territory while ‘exiled’ from home and family.

Difela are vastly different from Dithoka and the latter are primarily declaratory in delivery while Difela are said in a soft, chant-like fashion.

Diboko are like ‘family-odes’ and have existed since the beginning of know Basotho history. This form of poetry allows for different families and clans to be able to distinguish themselves from other groups. Every Sotho child is expected to learn the praise poems of their families and be able to confidently recite them during festivities of initiation. Praise poetry is also incorporated into sotho children's games.

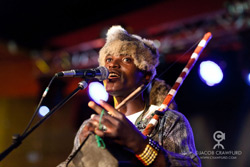
A member of Sotho Sounds reciting 'Difela' in 2011.

== Women and poetry ==
Women’s ‘difela’ performances occurred for the first time in illegal shebeens or taverns. In this setting, the women, brew and sell beer to migrants at home on leave during the diamond and gold boom. The women would entertain the miners with poetry, song, dance and sexual companionship. These ‘bar women’ are known as matekatse, translated ‘to wonder about’ or ‘odd job’. Thus the ‘shebeen songs’ of independent women are also ‘songs of affliction’ in which the women speak of their loves, trials and tribulations as women. The Basotho women poets thus resemble the African-American female blues vocalists who also had artistic talent and were considered socially deviant at the time.

Basotho men still deny the existence of female poets as traditionally, women were not seen as ‘eloquent’ or poets but as singers.’ Male poets also insist that a true praise poet does not perform in taverns around inebriated people but in an area where the audience can concentrate and appreciate the rhythmic aspects of the poetry.

== See also ==
- Z. D. Mangoaela
- Imbongi
- South African literature
