= Diocese of Lesotho =

Diocese in the Anglican Church of Southern Africa

Location
- Ecclesiastical province: Southern Africa

Statistics
- Parishes: 24

Information
- Rite: Anglican
- Cathedral: Cathedral of St. Mary and St. James, Maseru

Current leadership
- Bishop: Molemo Edwin Baatjies bishop elect

Website
- lesotho.tacosa.org

The Diocese of Lesotho is a diocese in the Anglican Church of Southern Africa. It comprises the entire nation of Lesotho. It is divided in three archdeaconries, Central Lesotho, Northern Lesotho and Southern Lesotho. The former bishop is Adam Taaso, in office since 2008 until 2020. The Right Revd Dr Vicentia Kgabe was appointed by the Synod of Bishops and installed on 5 December 2021.

== History ==
St John's Anglican Church in Maseru

Lesotho was originally included in the Anglican Diocese of the Free State but became an independent diocese in 1950, still with the name of Basutoland. The first bishop was John Maund, who would be in office from 1950 to 1976. Upon the independence from the United Kingdom in 1966, the diocese was renamed the Diocese of Lesotho.

The seat of the diocese is the Cathedral of St Mary and St James in Maseru.

== List of Bishops ==
- John Arrowsmith Maund, 1950–1976
- Desmond Mpilo Tutu, 1976–1978
- Philip Stanley Mokuku, 1978–1997
- Andrew Thabo Duma, 1997–1999
- Joseph Mahapu Tsubella, 1999–2006
- Vacant – 2007
- Adam Taaso, 2008–2020.
- Vicentia Kgabe was elected by the synod of bishops of the Anglican Church of Southern Africa, after the electoral college of the diocese of Lesotho failed to elect a successor to Taaso. She was consecrated in December 2021. On 22 September 2025 the elected of bishops elected her.
- Molemo Edwin Baatjies 2026-

=== Bishops suffragan ===
- Fortescue Tumelo Makhetha
- Donald Nestor
- Andrew Thabo Duma

== See also ==
- Religion in Lesotho
