= Les Walker (bishop) =

South African Anglican bishop

Les Walker was a South African Anglican bishop. He was the Bishop of Mpumalanga from 2005 to 2009.
