= Paul Khoarai =

- Bishop of Leribe
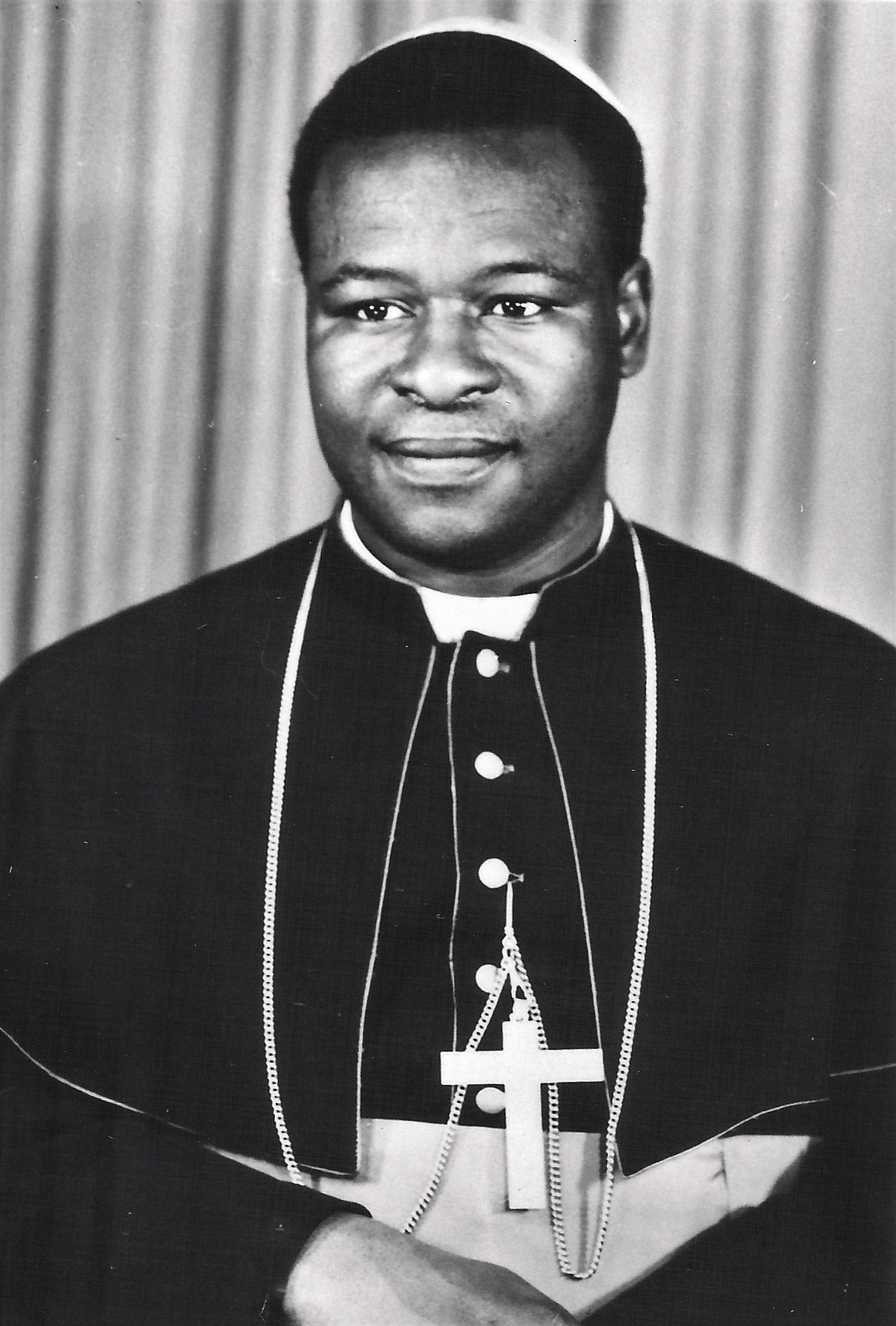
- Church: Catholic Church
- Diocese: Diocese of Leribe
- In office: 7 March 1970 – 30 June 2009
- Predecessor: Ignatius Phakoe
- Successor: Augustinus Tumaole Bane

Orders
- Ordination: 17 February 1963
- Consecration: 4 July 1970 by Alfonso Liguori Morapeli

Personal details
- Born: 29 May 1933
- Died: 27 December 2012 (aged 79)

Paul Khoarai (29 May 1933 – 27 December 2012) was the Roman Catholic bishop of the Roman Catholic Diocese of Leribe, Lesotho.

Ordained to the priesthood in 1963, Khoarai was named bishop in 1970 and retired in 2009.
