= Diocese of Mohale's Hoek =

Roman Catholic diocese in Lesotho

Coordinates: 30.1008°S 27.4800°E

Diocese of Mohale's Hoek Dioecesis Mohaleshoekensis

Location
- Country: Lesotho
- Ecclesiastical province: Maseru

Statistics
- Area: 5,799 km^{2} (2,239 sq mi)
- Population: Total; Catholics: (as of 2004); 533,595; 306,248 (57.4%)

Information
- Sui iuris church: Latin Church
- Rite: Roman Rite
- Cathedral: St. Patrick's Cathedral

Current leadership
- Pope: Leo XIV
- Bishop: John Joale Tlhomola
- Bishops emeritus: Sebastian Koto Khoarai (1978-2014)

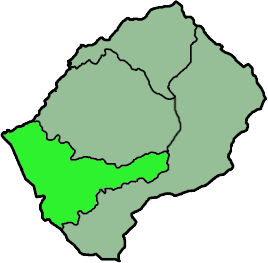
Location of the diocese within Lesotho

The Roman Catholic Diocese of Mohale's Hoek (Latin: Mohaleshoeken(sis)) is a diocese located in the city of Mohale’s Hoek in the ecclesiastical province of Maseru in Lesotho.

== History ==
- November 10, 1977: Established as Diocese of Mohale’s Hoek from Metropolitan Archdiocese of Maseru

== Ordinaries ==
=== Bishops of Mohale's Hoek ===
- Sebastian Koto Khoarai, O.M.I. (1977–2014) (elevated to Cardinal in 2016)
- John Joale Tlhomola (2014–present)

== See also ==
- Roman Catholicism in Lesotho
