= Emanuel Mabathoana =

Sesotho archibishop and composer (1904–1966)

The Most Reverend Emanuel Mabathoana OMI
- Archbishop of Maseru
- Church: Catholic Church
- Archdiocese: Maseru
- In office: 1961–65
- Successor: Alfonso Liguori Morapeli, OMI
- Previous post: Bishop of Leribe (1951–61)

Personal details
- Born: Emanuel Gregory ’Mabathoana; December 29, 1903 Mokhokhong
- Died: September 20, 1966 (aged 62)

Emanuel Gregory ’Mabathoana (1904–1966) was Sesotho Roman Catholic bishop. He was the Archbishop of Maseru, Lesotho. ’Mabathoana was the great-great-grandson of Moshoeshoe I, the first king of Lesotho.

Mabathoana was born in the village of Mokhokhong near Roma, Lesotho in Maseru District. He joined a seminary in 1924 and was ordained to the priestbood in 1933. He was appointed to the new post of bishop of Leribe in 1952, making him the first Mosotho bishop. In 1961, Pope John XXIII named ’Mabathoana to the new position of archbishop of Maseru, making him the first native African to rise to that level.

Throughout his career, he composed hymns for the Sesotho Hymn Book and become known as "The Singing Bishop". He also contributed to a translation of the bible into Sesotho.

In 1965, together with his staff, Mabathoana oversaw the founding of a second high school in Maseru. The school still exists today, named Mabathoana High School in honor of the archbishop.
