= Diocese of Qacha's Nek =

Roman Catholic diocese in Lesotho

Coordinates: 30.1154°S 28.6953°E

Diocese of Qacha’s Nek Dioecesis Qachasnekensis

Location
- Country: Lesotho
- Metropolitan: Maseru

Statistics
- Area: 11,409 km^{2} (4,405 sq mi)
- Population: Total; Catholics: (as of 2004); 382,933; 189,551 (49.5%)

Information
- Sui iuris church: Latin Church
- Rite: Roman Rite
- Cathedral: Cathedral of the Holy Redeemer

Current leadership
- Pope: Leo XIV
- Bishop: Joseph Mopeli Sephamola, O.M.I.

The Roman Catholic Diocese of Qacha's Nek (Latin: Qachasneken(sis)) is a diocese located in the town of Qacha’s Nek in the ecclesiastical province of Maseru in Lesotho.

== History ==
- January 3, 1961: Established as Diocese of Qacha’s Nek from Diocese of Maseru

== Leadership ==
Bishops of Qacha’s Nek

- Joseph Delphis Des Rosiers, O.M.I. (January 3, 1961 – 1981)
- Evaristus Thatho Bitsoane (1981-2010)
- Joseph Mopeli Sephamola, O.M.I. (June 19, 2013 -)

== See also ==
- Roman Catholicism in Lesotho

== Sources ==
- GCatholic.org
- Catholic Hierarchy

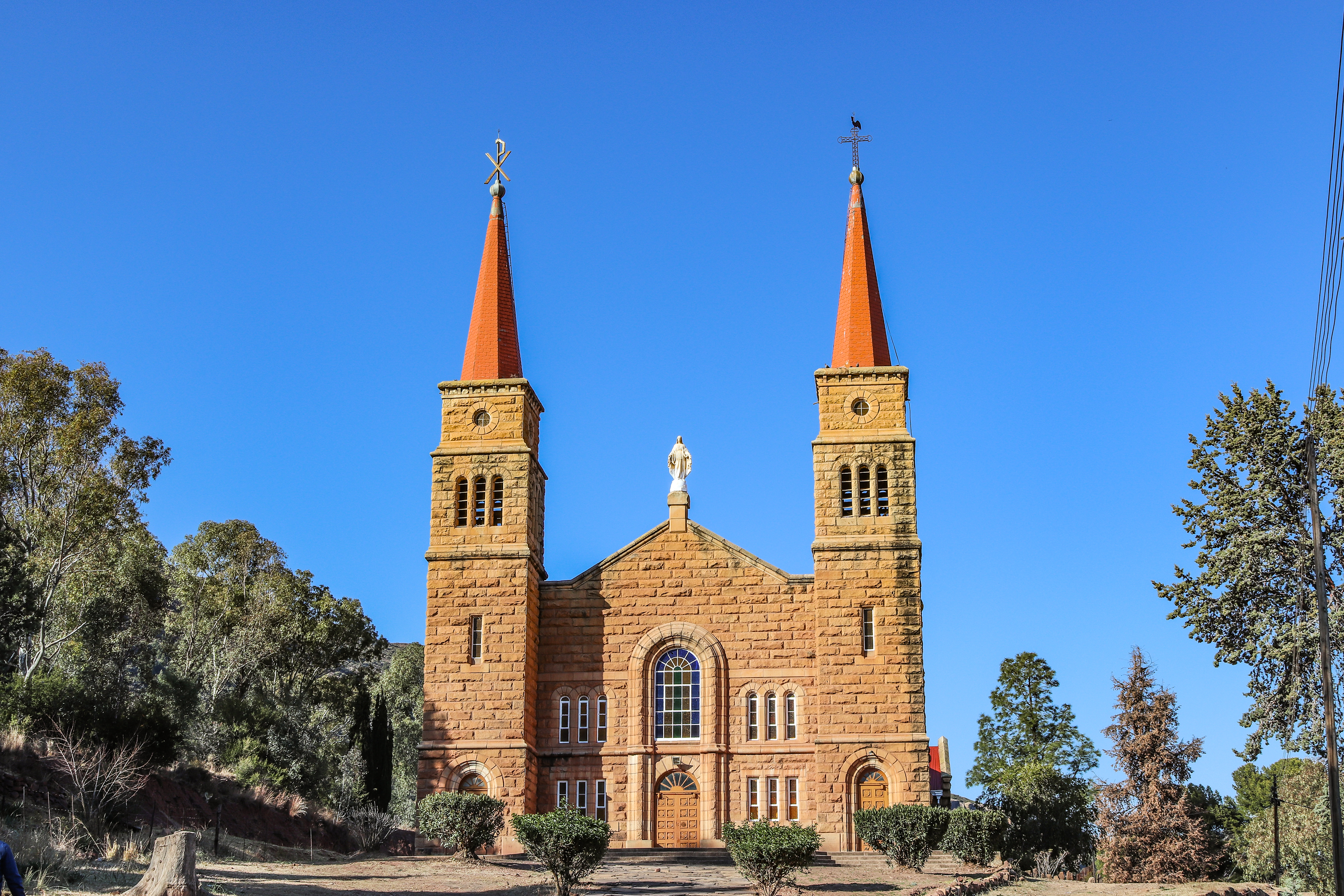
Villa Maria Catholic Church at Mokanametsong, Quthing
