= Diocese of Leribe =

Roman Catholic diocese in Lesotho

Coordinates: 28.9005°S 27.9568°E

Diocese of Leribe Dioecesis Leribensis
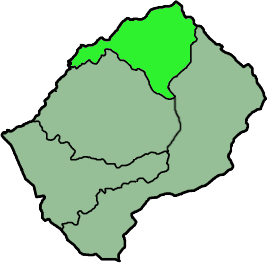

Location
- Country: Lesotho
- Metropolitan: Maseru

Statistics
- Area: 5,129 km^{2} (1,980 sq mi)
- Population: Total; Catholics: (as of 2023); 455,700; 266,753 (58.5%)

Information
- Sui iuris church: Latin Church
- Rite: Roman Rite
- Cathedral: St. Monica's Cathedral, Tsikoane
- Co-cathedral: St. Joseph Co-Cathedral, Hlotse

Current leadership
- Pope: Leo XIV
- Bishop: Vitalis Sekhonyana Marole

The Roman Catholic Diocese of Leribe (Latin: Leriben(sis)) is a diocese located in the city of Leribe in the ecclesiastical province of Maseru in Lesotho.

== History ==
- December 11, 1952: Established as Diocese of Leribe from the Diocese of Maseru

== Leadership ==
- Bishops of Leribe (Latin Church)
  - Bishop Emanuel Mabathoana (1952.12.11 – 1961.01.03), appointed Archbishop of Maseru
  - Bishop Ignatius Phakoe (1961.01.03 – 1968.06.18)
  - Bishop Paul Khoarai (1970.03.07 – 2009.06.30)
  - Bishop Augustine Tumaole Bane (2009.09.19 – 2025.02.28)
  - Bishop Vitalis Sekhonyana Marole, O.M.I. (2025.02.28 – present)

== Sources ==
- GCatholic.org
- Catholic Hierarchy
