= Catholic Church in Lesotho =

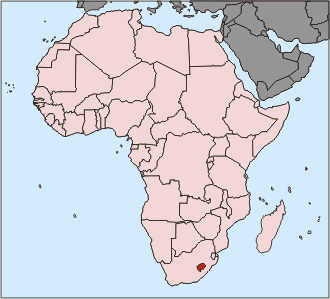
Lesotho highlighted in red

The Catholic Church in Lesotho is part of the worldwide Catholic Church, under the spiritual leadership of the Pope in Rome.

In 2020, over 90 percent of the population were Christians; followers of traditional religion, along with Muslims, Hindus and Baha'is, constitute the remainder.

In 2020, Catholics accounted for 45 percent of the population. However, other estimates were much higher.

Christians are scattered throughout the country, while Muslims live mainly in the northeastern part of the country. Most practitioners of Islam are of Asian origin, while the majority of Christians are the indigenous Basotho.

Many Christians still practice their traditional cultural beliefs and rituals along with Christianity. The Catholic Church has fused some aspects of local culture into its services. For example, the singing of hymns during services has developed into a local and traditional way of singing (a repetitive call and response style) in Sesotho, the indigenous language, as well as English. In addition priests are seen dressed in local dress during services.

The prominent role of the Catholic Church in the country derives from the successful establishment of Catholic schools in the 20th century and their influence over education policy. The Catholic Church used to own about 75 percent of all primary and secondary schools in the country, and was instrumental in establishing the National University of Lesotho; as of 2007, however, it owned less than 40 percent of the primary and secondary schools.

The Catholic Church helped found the Basotho National Party (BNP) in 1959 and sponsored it in the independence elections in 1966. Most members of the BNP are practicing Catholics. The BNP ruled the country from independence in 1966 until 1985 when it was overthrown in a military coup. The then-opposition Basutoland Congress Party (BCP) historically has been aligned with the Protestant Lesotho Evangelical Church.

There are 4 dioceses including one archdiocese:

- Maseru
  - Leribe
  - Mohale’s Hoek
  - Qacha’s Nek

== See also ==
- Religion in Lesotho
- List of saints from Africa
