= Qacha's Nek =

Camptown of Qacha's Nek District in Lesotho

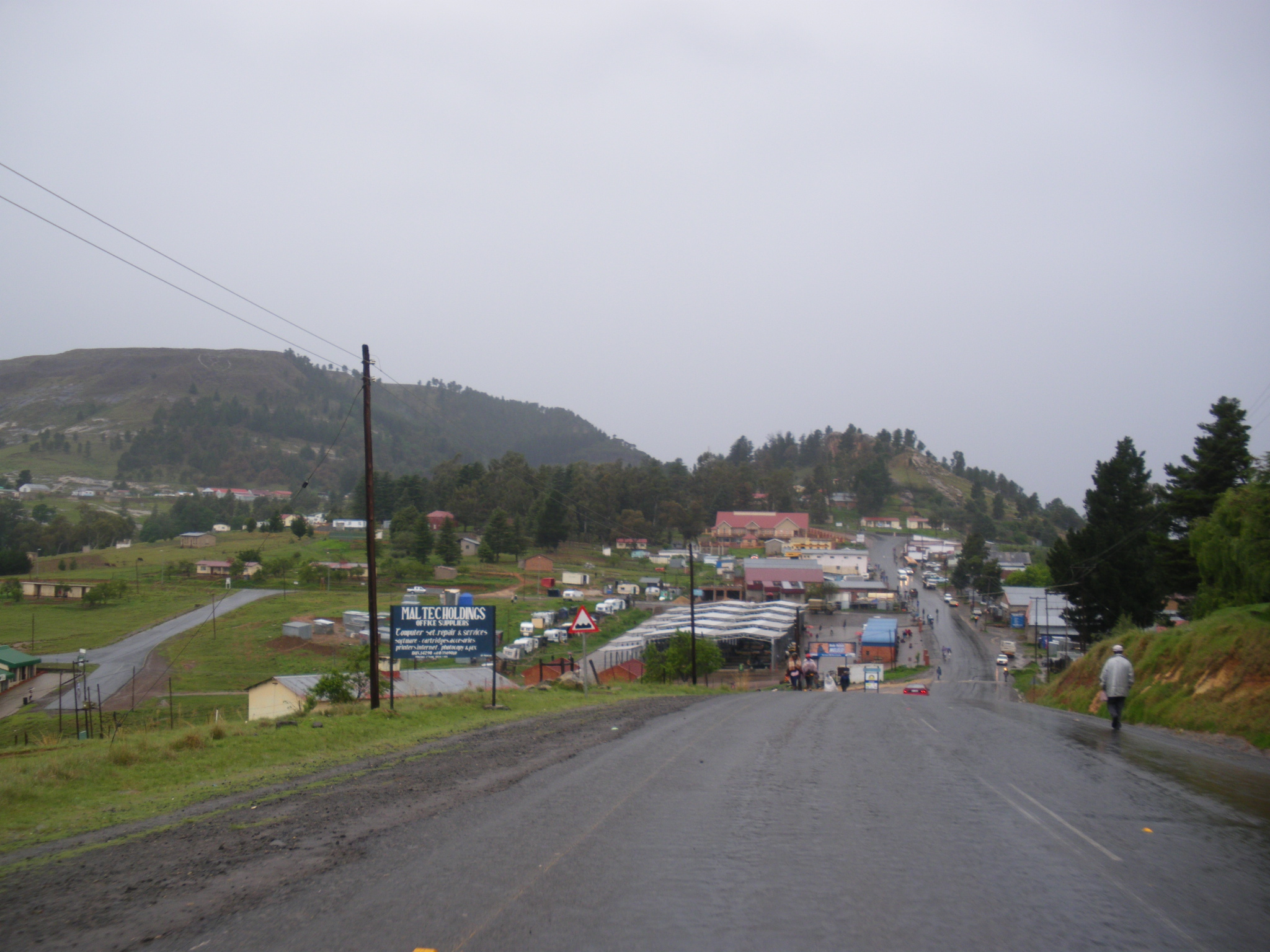
Qacha's Nek

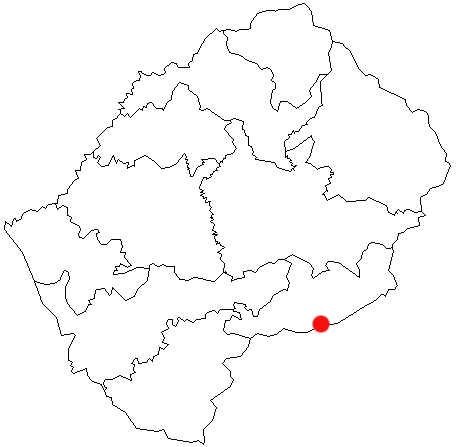
Location of Qacha's Nek in Lesotho

Qacha's Nek is a constituency and, since 1888, the camptown (capital) of Qacha's Nek District in Lesotho, only two kilometres from the South African border at 1,980 metres (6,500 ft) above sea level. It has a population of approximately 15,900 (2016). It is home to Machabeng Government Hospital, one of the two hospitals in the district (the other being the Lesotho Evangelical Church's Tebellong Hospital, which is about 40 kilometres (25 mi) away, across the Orange River which is known as Senqu in Lesotho).

== Tourism features ==
The town is home to Lesotho's first and only Snake Park, which is conveniently situated at the foot of the historic Letloepe hill/rock formation. This is where the cave of Ncatya (called "Qacha" by Basotho), the son of the Baphuthi Supreme Ruler, after whom the town is named, is situated. ("Letloepe" means the cobra's defensive hood, and is the alternative name for Qacha's Nek). The locality may be the only place in Africa where California Redwood trees grow (the area is visible on the photo, to the right-hand side of the wooded Letloepe hill).

As one enters the town from Maseru (1 km from the road in the picture), one can see the famous lefika-motho ("man-rock"), which looks like a man's head with a cap on. There are several spots where San paintings can still be found. The Sehlabathebe National Park, home of the Sehlabathebe water lily, is about 2 hours away by tar road.

== Demography ==
The people of Qacha's Nek are called "Melele" (Wanderers), and the colours of the place / district are maroon and white. Other than Sesotho and English, people speak Xhosa and Sephuthi.

== Climate ==
The town has 900 mm precipitation per year, the highest annual rainfall of any Lesotho district capital. From the nearby Indian Ocean clouds move up almost daily, so that in Qacha's Nek fog often prevails. In the summer, the average temperature is 17 °C. Because of its climate, Qacha's Nek is green longer than most other places in Lesotho every year, and is very refreshing. There is an increasing population of fauna like snails, and the place has always had several species of rare flora.

Climate data for Qacha's Nek (1981–2010)
Month	Jan	Feb	Mar	Apr	May	Jun	Jul	Aug	Sep	Oct	Nov	Dec	Year
Mean daily maximum °C (°F)	25.0 (77.0)	24.3 (75.7)	22.5 (72.5)	20.2 (68.4)	17.5 (63.5)	14.5 (58.1)	14.7 (58.5)	17.1 (62.8)	20.5 (68.9)	21.3 (70.3)	22.8 (73.0)	24.6 (76.3)	20.4 (68.7)
Mean daily minimum °C (°F)	12.7 (54.9)	12.5 (54.5)	10.8 (51.4)	8.1 (46.6)	5.2 (41.4)	2.6 (36.7)	2.3 (36.1)	4.3 (39.7)	7.0 (44.6)	8.5 (47.3)	10.1 (50.2)	11.7 (53.1)	8.0 (46.4)
Average rainfall mm (inches)	150.3 (5.92)	121.0 (4.76)	83.4 (3.28)	39.8 (1.57)	10.9 (0.43)	15.7 (0.62)	12.0 (0.47)	23.5 (0.93)	33.1 (1.30)	71.2 (2.80)	86.7 (3.41)	118.0 (4.65)	765.6 (30.14)
Average rainy days (≥ 0.5 mm)	15	11	10	6	3	2	2	3	4	10	11	12	89
Source: World Meteorological Organization

=== Border Post ===
	South Africa	Lesotho
Region	Eastern Cape	Qacha's Nek District
Nearest town	Matatiele	Qacha's Nek
Road	Connects to R56	connects to A4
GPS Coordinates	30°07′57″S 28°41′2″E	30°07′46″S 28°41′8″E
Telephone number	+27 (0) 39 256 4391	
Fax number		
Business hours Travellers	06:00 - 22:00	06:00 - 22:00
Business hours General	07:30 - 16:15	
