= Archdiocese of Maseru =

Roman Catholic archdiocese in Lesotho

Coordinates: 29.3170°S 27.4949°E

Archdiocese of Maseru Archidiœcesis Maseruenus
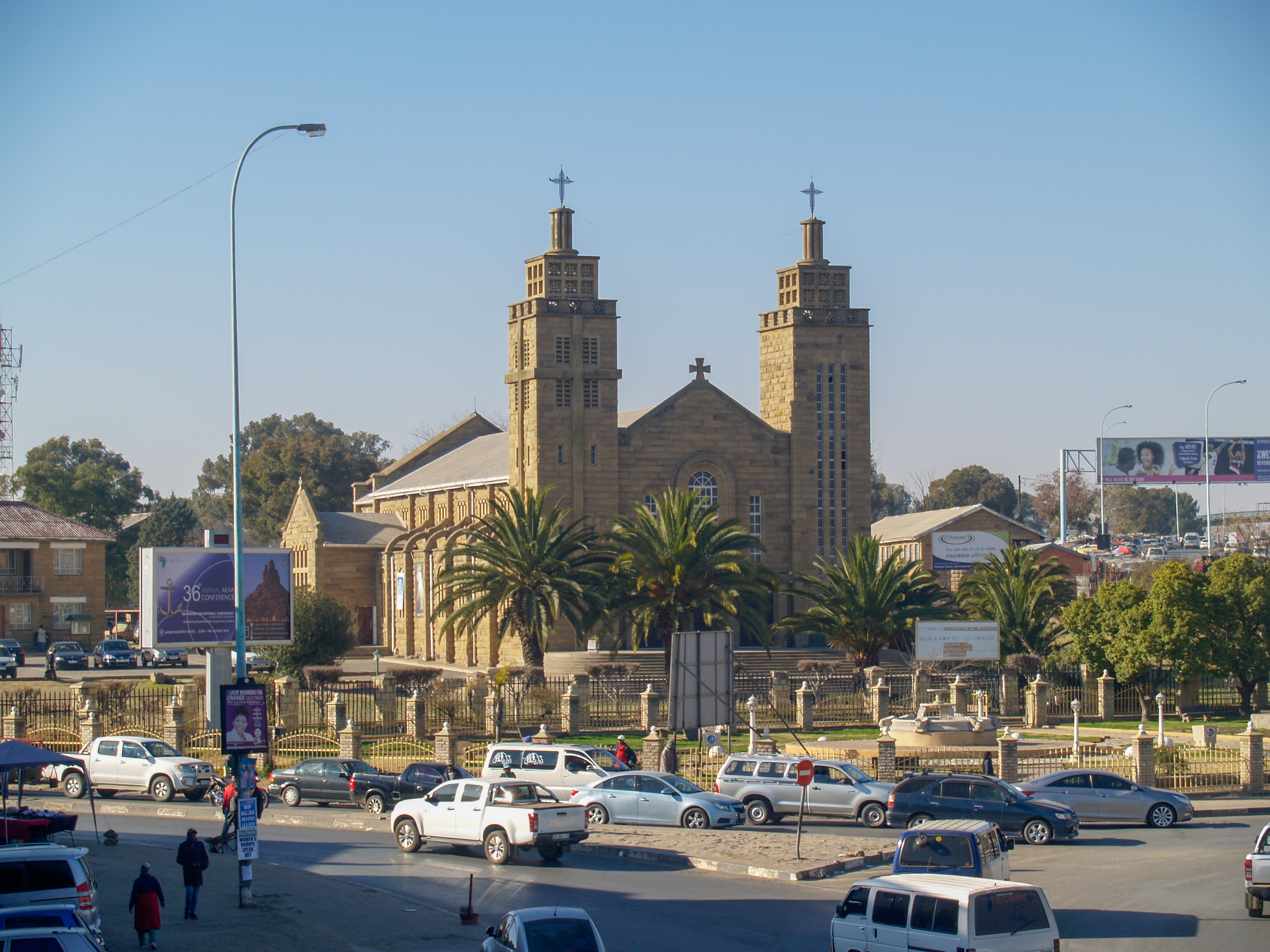
- Our Lady of Victories Cathedral

Location
- Country: Lesotho

Statistics
- Area: 7,739 km^{2} (2,988 sq mi)
- Population: Total; Catholics: (as of 2022); 987,222; 495,181 (50.2%)
- Parishes: 36

Information
- Denomination: Catholic Church
- Sui iuris church: Latin Church
- Rite: Roman Rite
- Established: 8 May 1894; 131 years ago
- Cathedral: Our Lady of Victories Cathedral
- Secular priests: 62

Current leadership
- Pope: Leo XIV
- Archbishop: Gerard Tlali Lerotholi

The Roman Catholic Archdiocese of Maseru (Latin: Maseruen(us)) is the metropolitan see for the ecclesiastical province of Maseru in Lesotho. The cathedral church of the diocese is the Our Lady of Victories Cathedral.

== History ==
- 8 May 1894: Established as Apostolic Prefecture of Basutoland from the Apostolic Vicariate of Kimberley in Orange in South Africa
- 18 February 1909: Promoted as Apostolic Vicariate of Basutoland
- 11 January 1951: Promoted as Diocese of Maseru
- 3 January 1961: Promoted as Metropolitan Archdiocese of Maseru

== Leadership ==
Prefects Apostolic of Basutoland

- Father Jules-Joseph Cénez, OMI (1895 – 25 January 1909); see below

Vicars Apostolic of Basutoland

- Jules-Joseph Cénez, OMI (25 January 1909 – 24 May 1930); see above
- Joseph Bonhomme, OMI (25 April 1933 – 8 March 1947)
- Joseph Delphis Des Rosiers, OMI (11 March 1948 – 11 January 1951); see below

Bishops of Maseru

- Joseph Delphis Des Rosiers, OMI (11 January 1951 – 3 January 1961), appointed Bishop of Qacha's Nek; see above

Archbishops of Maseru

- Emanuel Mabathoana, OMI (3 January 1961 – 20 September 1966)
- Alfonso Liguori Morapeli, OMI (13 April 1967 – 17 May 1989)
- Bernard Mohlalisi, OMI (11 June 1990 – 30 June 2009)
- Gerard Tlali Lerotholi (30 June 2009 – present)

== Suffragan dioceses ==
- Leribe
- Mohale’s Hoek
- Qacha’s Nek

== See also ==
- Catholic Church in Lesotho
- List of Roman Catholic dioceses in Lesotho

== Sources ==
- GCatholic.org
