= Alpheus =

Alpheus or Alphaeus is a masculine given name which may refer to:

== Mythological, biblical and fictional figures ==
- Alpheus (deity), a river god in Greek mythology
- Alphaeus, father of two of the Twelve Apostles in the New Testament
- Alpheus, the World Forger, a DC Comics character

== People ==
=== Ancient Greece ===
- Alpheus Mytilenaeus, 1st century BC Greek poet
- Alphaeus, a Spartan hoplite who fought well at the Battle of Thermopylae, according to the historian Herodotus

=== Modern world ===
- Alpheus Babcock (1785–1842), American piano and musical instrument maker and inventor
- Alpheus Baker (1828–1891), Confederate brigadier general in the American Civil War
- Alpheus Batson (1869–?), American lawyer and politician
- Alpheus Michael Bowman (1847–1913), American politician and businessman
- A. B. Colton (born 1831), American politician from Minnesota
- Alpheus Cutler (1784–1864), an early leader in the Latter Day Saint movement
- Alpheus Deane (1916–1986), American Negro league pitcher in the 1947
- Alpheus Dimmick (1787–1865), American lawyer and politician
- Alpheus Ellis (1906–1995), American banker and philanthropist
- Alpheus Felch (1804–1896), American politician, fifth governor of Michigan and U.S. Senator from Michigan
- Alpheus Harding (1818–1903), American politician and bank president
- Alpheus F. Haymond (1823–1893), American lawyer, politician and justice of the Supreme Court of Appeals of West Virginia
- Alpheus P. Hodges (1821–1858), first mayor of Los Angeles, California, after its incorporation
- Alpheus Hyatt (1838–1902), American zoologist and palaeontologist
- Alpheus T. Mason (1899–1989), American legal scholar and biographer
- Alpheus C. Morse (1818–1893), American architect
- Alpheus Morton (1840–1923), British architect, surveyor and politician
- Alpheus Muheua (c. 1956–2022), Namibian politician
- Alpheus ǃNaruseb (born 1954), Namibian politician
- Alpheus Spring Packard Sr. (1798–1884), American professor of ancient language and classical literature and acting president of Bowdoin College, father of Alpheus Spring Packard Jr.
- Alpheus Spring Packard Jr. (1839–1905), American entomologist and palaeontologist
- Alpheus Potts (1838–1911), American lawyer, judge and politician
- Alpheus Quicy (1774–1875), African-American stonemason who built houses and other buildings in Connecticut
- Alpheus Sherman (1780–1866). American lawyer and politician
- Alpheus Henry Snow (1859–1920), American lawyer and scholarly investigator in the field of international law
- Alpheus Beede Stickney (1840–1916), first president of the Chicago Great Western Railway
- Alpheus George Barnes Stonehouse (1862–1931), Canadian circus owner
- A. E. Sunderland (1866–1940), American banker, businessman and mayor of Fresno, California
- Alpheus Todd (1821–1884), English-born Canadian librarian and constitutional historian
- Alpheus Hyatt Verrill (1871–1954), known as Hyatt Verrill, American zoologist, explorer, inventor, illustrator and writer of natural history and science fiction
- Alpheus S. Williams (1810–1878), American lawyer, judge, journalist, politician and Union general in the American Civil War
- Alpheus Waters Wilson (1834–1916), American bishop for the Methodist Episcopal Church, South
- Alpheus Field Wood (1828–1910), Canadian merchant and politician
- Alphaeus Zulu (1905–1987), South African Anglican bishop

== See also ==
- Alphaeus (disambiguation)
