= Vikinduku Mnculwane =

Anglican bishop in Zululand

Vikinduku Victor Mnculwane (born 2 June 1959) is a South African Anglican Bishop of the Diocese of Zululand. He was elected at an Elective Assembly of the Diocese of Zululand, held on 20 May 2021 and his episcopal ordination was on 12 September 2021, held at the Cathedral Church of St Michael and All Angels in Eshowe. He succeeds Bishop Monument Makhanya as the fifteenth bishop of Zululand.

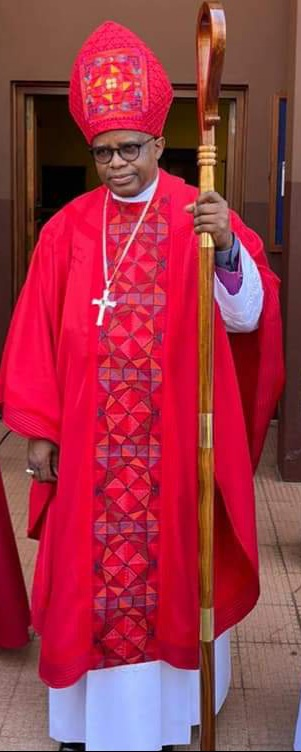
The Right Rev Vikinduku Mnculwane - Bishop of Zululand

== Early life ==
Vikinduku Mnculwane was born in Estcourt at a village called Ntabamhlophe (Mdwebu area) on 2 June 1959. He is one of the seven children of Ntombi Christine (MaSithole) and Joseph Muzikayise Mnculwane. He completed his high-schooling at eMtshezi High School in 1979.

== Further education ==
After completing his schooling, he went to study at Cwaka College of Agriculture, Empangeni which was a college for black students during the Apartheid era. In 1981 he graduated with a Diploma in Agriculture and in 1982 started working as an agricultural extension officer for the Department of Agriculture until 1986. He was responsible for providing agricultural extension services for both commercial and subsistence farmers in areas of Mahlabathini and Ulundi. It was during this time where he felt a calling to the vocation of priesthood in the Anglican church.

== Ministry ==
After discerning a calling in 1986, the Diocese of Zululand sent him to study theology at the St Paul's College, Grahamstown where he graduated with a Diploma in Theology in 1989. He was made a deacon on 16 December 1989 and ordained a priest on 16 December 1990 by Lawrence Zulu, the bishop of Zululand.

He served his curacy at the Cathedral of St Michael and All Angels, Eshowe in 1989 and 1990. He was the rector of St Margaret's Parish in Mafitleng (Nquthu area) between January 1991 and December 1995. He became a rector of All Saints in Gingindlovu in 1996 and went to work in the Diocese of Natal as the rector of St Phillip's in Dundee, KwaZulu-Natal (1997–1999), rector of St Christopher's in Sobantu (Jan 2000 – July 2001) and rector of Ekuvukeni in KwaMashu (August 2001 – February 2006). Having been interested in furthering his theological education, he graduated with a Bachelor of Theology degree and Bachelor of Theology Honours degree from the University of South Africa (UNISA). Having realised the need for priests to have some background in finance, he enrolled at Varsity College to study for the Diploma in Management Accounting and Finance. He then pursued and graduated in 2003 with Masters in Theology degree specialising in Systematic Theology from the University of KwaZulu Natal (UKZN). His thesis is titled Can a critical analysis of Hans Küng's early ecclesiology (1960-1970) yield some paradigmatic examples for a contemporary redemptive community in South Africa? It was his time as the rector of Ekuvukeni that he was appointed Canon of the Cathedral of the Holy Nativity, Pietermaritzburg.

The parish of Ekuvukeni had community outreach programmes that inspired Mnculwane to be interested in public administration. This interest led him to study at the University of Stellenbosch and graduate with Postgraduate Diploma in Monitoring and Evaluation Systems and Honours Bachelor of Public Administration.

== Work in the public service ==
He left stipendiary ministry in February 2006 to become a public servant. He was employed by the KwaZulu-Natal Provincial Government in the following positions and departments:

- Department of Arts and Culture - Assistant Director – Language Planning and Policy (April 2006 – August 2007)
- Office of the Premier KZN – Deputy Director Policy and Research (September 2007 – November 2015)
- Office of the Premier KZN – Director of Heritage Research and Policy Research (December 2015 – July 2019)
- Acting Chief Executive Officer (CEO) of a public entity Amafa AkwaZulu-Natali linked to the Office of the Premier (May 2016 – July 2019).

While working as a director in the KZN Premier's Office, he was asked by the premier to be the acting chief executive officer of a public entity linked to the Premier's office, and responsible for managing the national estate in the province. He held both of these positions simultaneously while overseeing the process of merging the two entities in question to establish a Research Institute.

In 2009 he graduated with a Masters of Public Administration from the University of Stellenbosch. His thesis is titled An Assessment of the Implementation of The Service Delivery Improvement Policy In The Department Of Arts, Culture And Tourism In KZN. In 2016 he graduated at the University of KwaZulu-Natal (UKZN) with a Doctoral Degree in Public Administration having written a thesis titled A phenomenological investigation into the use of incentives to solicit community participation in heritage policy implementation in post 1994 South Africa.

During his time as a public servant he continued with his vocation in ordained ministry as an assistant priest at St Christopher's parish in Sobantu. The diocesan bishop would also request him to look after a parish that had no rector in the pastoral charge and conduct clergy retreats. The Iviyo Lofakazi BakaKristu would also request him to be a guest speaker at their conferences around different dioceses.

== Return to full-time ministry ==
In August 2019, Dino Gabriel (bishop of Natal) appointed him as the rector of St Augustine's parish of Umlazi. This was his return to full-time or stipendiary ministry.

On 19 May 2021 at an elective assembly of the Diocese of Zululand Mnculwane was elected to be the fifteenth bishop of Zululand with a two-thirds majority vote at the first ballot. He was ordained a bishop on 12 September by Archbishop Thabo Makgoba as the principal consecrator with Bishop Raphael Hess (Bishop of Saldahna Bay) and Bishop Ebenezer Ntlali (Bishop of Grahamstown) as the co- consecrators.

== Personal life ==
He married Lindiwe Rejoice MaNkwanyana on 7 July 1990 with whom he has three children, Sinenhlanhla Sindisiwe (died 2010), Duduzile Buyisiwe and Dumisani Simphiwe.

An unfortunate situation happened during his time at Ekuvukeni where he was hijacked at a local road in KwaMashu and shot seven times.

== Published works ==
- An Assessment of the Implementation of the Service Delivery Improvement Policy in the Department of Arts, Culture and Tourism in KZN (Masters). Stellenbosch University. 2009. hdl:10019.1/1687.
- A Phenomenological Investigation into the Use of Incentives to Solicit Community Participation in Heritage Policy Implementation in Post 1994 South Africa (Doctoral). UKZN. 2016. hdl:10413/15560.
- "Shaping an Expanded Principal-Agent Model for Designing and Deploying Incentives as an Instrument for Improving Performance in Public Policy Management". Journal of Economics. 6 (1): 18–29. 2017. doi:10.1080/09765239.2015.11885013. ISSN 0976-5239. S2CID 159022225.
- Can a critical analysis of Hans Küng's early ecclesiology (1960-1970) yield some paradigmatic examples for a contemporary redemptive community in South Africa? (Masters thesis) (masters). Pietermaritzburg: University of Natal. 2003. hdl:10413/7611.
- "The regeneration of the case study methodology to understand the complexities of policy implementation". Administratio Publica. 22 (1): 85–107. March 2014. ISSN 1015-4833.
