= Diocese of Eswatini =

Anglican diocese in Eswatini

Location
- Ecclesiastical province: Anglican Church of Southern Africa

Statistics
- Parishes: 24

Information
- Rite: Anglican
- Cathedral: Cathedral Church of All Saints, Mbabane

Current leadership
- Bishop: Dalcy Badeli Dlamini

Website
- www.swazilanddiocese.org.sz

The Diocese of Eswatini is a diocese in the Anglican Church of Southern Africa. It was founded in 1968. It comprises the country of Eswatini. It is divided in three archdeaconries: Eastern, Southern and Western.

== History ==
The diocese was created in 1968, shortly after the independence of Swaziland and had Anthony Hunter as its first bishop, from 1968 to 1975.

== Bishops ==
- Anthony Hunter, 1968–1975
- Bernard Lazarus Nyoni Mkhabela, 1975–1993
- Lawrence Bekisisa Zulu, 1993–2000
- Meshack Boy Mabuza, 2002–2012
- Ellinah Wamukoya, 2012–2021
- Dalcy Badeli Dlamini, 2022–present

== Coat of arms ==
The diocese registered a coat of arms at the Bureau of Heraldry in 1969 : Azure, two Swazi battle-axes erect addorsed, handles Or, blades Argent, bound Gules. The shield is ensigned of a bishop's mitre.

== Companion dioceses ==
- (Scotland) The Diocese of Brechin in the Scottish Episcopal Church
- (United States) The Diocese of Iowa in the Episcopal Church
- (South Africa) The Diocese of Highveld in the Anglican Church of Southern Africa
