= Wilmot Vyvyan =

The Right Reverend Wilmot Lushington Vyvyan
- Bishop of Zululznd
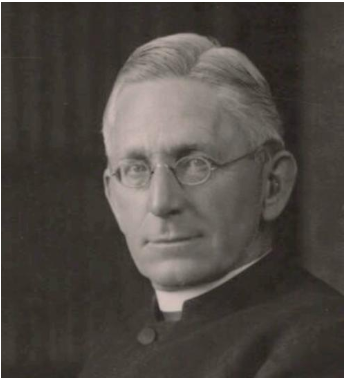
- Bishop W.L. Vyvyan
- Church: Anglican
- Province: Southern Africa
- Diocese: Zululand
- Elected: 1903

Personal details
- Born: 12 August 1861 Dorchester, Dorset
- Died: 26 August 1937 (aged 76) Grahamstown, South Africa
- Education: Charterhouse
- Alma mater: Trinity College, Cambridge
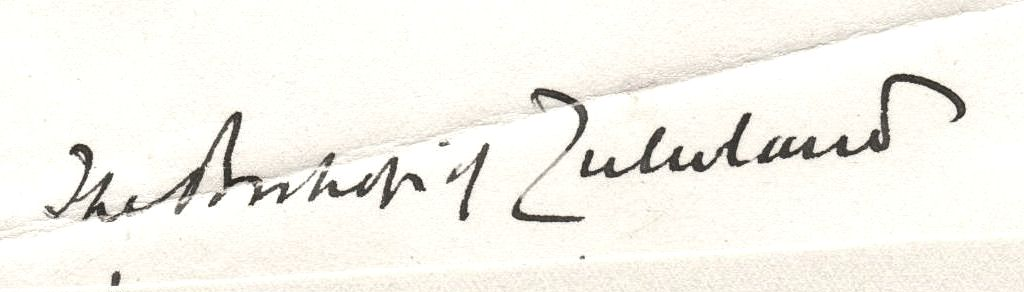
- Signature

The Rt Rev Wilmot Lushington Vyvyan (12 August 1861 – 26 August 1937) was an Anglican Bishop in the mid-20th century.

== Background ==
Born into a noble family on 12 August 1861, Wilmot Vyvyan was educated at Charterhouse and Trinity College, Cambridge, from where he graduated in 1883.

== Career ==
Ordained in 1888, he was curate at the Charterhouse Mission, St Hugh's, Southwark, becoming its priest in charge from 1892 until 1901, when he emigrated to South Africa. Here he was mission priest at Isandhlwana before elevation to the episcopate as the fourth bishop of Zululand in January 1903, a post he was to hold for 26 years. He died on 26 August 1937.

== Bibliography ==
- Foster, Joseph (1871). The pedigree of Wilson of High Wray & Kendal, and the families connected with them.
- Hewison, Hope Hay (1989). Hedge of Wild Almonds: South Africa, the Pro-Boers & the Quaker Conscience, 1890-1910. James Currey Publishers. ISBN 978-0-85255-031-1.
- Lee, Albert William (1930). Charles Johnson of Zululand. London.
- Wills, Walter H. (2006). The Anglo-African Who's Who and Biographical Sketchbook, 1907. Jeppestown Press. ISBN 978-0-9553936-3-1.
- Butler, Guy (2000). The prophetic nun: Sister Margaret CR, Sister Pauline CR, Sister Dorothy Raphael CSMV. Random House. ISBN 978-0-9584195-4-3.
- Jones, Timothy Willem (2011). "The Missionaries' Position: Polygamy and Divorce in the Anglican Communion, 1888-1988". Journal of Religious History. 35 (3): 393–408. doi:10.1111/j.1467-9809.2011.01077.x. ISSN 0022-4227.

Anglican Church of Southern Africa titles
Preceded by William Marlborough Carter	Bishop of Zululand; 1903–1929	Succeeded by Charles Arthur William Aylen
