= Iviyo loFakazi bakaKristu =

Iviyo loFakazi bakaKristu (in English: The Legion of Christ's Witnesses) is an evangelical and charismatic movement within the Anglican Church of Southern Africa.

== History ==
Iviyo had its origins in Zululand, in 1944, when Anglican priest, Reverend Philip Mbatha had a vision of Jesus as the Good Shepherd. At more or less the same time, another priest from the Diocese of St John's, Alpheus Zulu, (who later became bishop of Zululand), was experiencing a crisis in his ministry. The two priests met periodically for the next few years and in 1948, founded Iviyo. The priests were motivated to start the movement on the basis of their visionary experiences and their view of the Anglican church as dry and equivocal. The movement they formed was essentially extremely high church, incorporating pentecostal evangelicalism. Iviyo is a Zulu Anglican movement that is expressly high church, charismatic and evangelical. The high church roots can be explained by the founders' close association with the Community of the Resurrection. Its aim was to promote Christian proficiency — living a disciplined Christian life of prayer, fasting, sacraments, Bible reading, confession and evangelism.

During the Apartheid era in the 1980s, Iviyo was seen as being aligned with the Zulu Nationalist/Inkatha/right-wing political forces.

In 2018, the Diocese of Grahamstown started a Xhosa language version of the movement, named Ibutho Labavakalisi Bakakristu.
