= Alpheus (disambiguation) =

Alpheus is a masculine given name. It may also refer to:

- Alpheus (crustacean), a genus of shrimps
- HMS Alpheus, a Royal Navy frigate in service from 1814 to 1817
- Alpheus, West Virginia, United States, an unincorporated community
- Alfeios or Alpheus, a Greek river with which the ancient Greek mythological god Alpheus is associated
