= Thomas Nevile Carter =

English footballer (1851–1879)

Thomas Nevile Carter (September 1851 – 16 November 1879) was an English amateur sportsman who played for England in the second unofficial football match against Scotland, in November 1870. He was the brother of the Rev William Marlborough Carter KCMG, DD and the nephew of Canon T. T. Carter. He was killed by lightning in South Africa, aged 28.

== Family ==
Carter was born at Eton College, where he was baptised on 16 September 1851. He was the fourth son of William Adolphus Carter (1815–1901) and his wife Gertrude née Rogers (1826–1909). His father was a Master, Fellow and Bursar at Eton College.

His father's brother was Thomas Thellusson Carter (1808–1901), who became a significant figure in the Victorian Church of England. His own brothers included William Marlborough Carter (1850–1941), who became Bishop of Zululand and then Bishop of Pretoria, before becoming Archbishop of Cape Town from 1909 to 1930, and Frank Willington Carter (1865–1945), who became a businessman in Calcutta and philanthropist, co-founding the British Empire Leprosy Relief Association.

== Education ==
Carter attended Eton College between 1864 and 1871. While at the college, he was a member of the College, Mixed Wall and Field elevens and Keeper of the Field (captain of the football XI) in 1870. He won the School Fives in 1870–71 and was Keeper of the Fives in 1871. He was also the editor of the Eton College Chronicle in 1871.

The Eton Register claims that Carter attended The Queen's College, Oxford, gaining an MA, but there is no evidence of this in the college records.

== Football career ==
In November 1870, C. W. Alcock and Arthur F. Kinnaird were organising the second "international" match between an England XI and a Scotland XI. Alcock selected four schoolboys to represent England: Carter (captain of Eton College, aged 19), Walter Paton (captain of Harrow School aged 17), Henry J. Preston (also Eton College, aged 19) and Walpole Vidal (Westminster School, aged 17).

The match was played at the Kennington Oval on 19 November 1870 and ended in a 1–0 victory to the English, with the solitary goal coming from R.S.F. Walker. Although nominally playing as a defender, Carter had a goal disallowed.

== Later life and death ==
Nothing is known about Carter's life after leaving Eton College in 1871, until his death from a lightning strike in the Transvaal, South Africa on 16 November 1879.

== Bibliography ==
- Old Etonian Association (1906). The Eton Register:1862–1868. Spottiswoode & Co.
- Mitchell, Andy (2012). First Elevens: The Birth of International Football. Andy Mitchell Media. ISBN 978-1475206845.
