= Alphaeus (disambiguation) =

Alphaeus is a man mentioned in the New Testament as the father of two of the Twelve Apostles.

Alphaeus may also refer to:

== Saints ==
- Alphaeus and Zacchaeus, 4th-century Christian martyrs

== People ==
- Alphaeus Philemon Cole (1876–1988), American artist, engraver and etcher
- Alphaeus Patterson (1856–1931), Canadian politician and businessman
- Alphaeus Zulu (1905–1987), South African Anglican bishop

== Fictional characters ==
- Alphaeus "Alphy" Kottaram, a main character of the British television show Grantchester

== Other ==
- Alphaeus, a synonym for a genus of shrimps, Alpheus (crustacean)

== See also ==
- Alpheus (disambiguation)
- Capys alphaeus, a butterfly
