= B & W Fisk-Moore Ltd Photographers =

Brothers James and William Fisk-Moore were photographers active in Kent from around 1911. They traded under the name of B&W Fisk-Moore Ltd, James having taken the name of Beaufort James Fisk-Moore.

== Early life ==
Beaufort and William's mother was Louisa Fisk, born in 1839 in St Albans, Hertfordshire. In 1862 she married John Moore in the same city.

The 1911 Census shows Beaufort J Fisk-Moore aged 34, (Note: James Fisk-Moore (Folkestone 1876 – Bridge 1949) GRO index: Births Sep 1876 Moore James Elham 2a 932. Deaths Sep 1949 Fisk-Moore James 73 Bridge 5b 69.) and William Fisk-Moore aged 30. (Note: William Fisk-Moore (Folkestone 1881 – Harrogate 1953). GRO index: Births Sep 1881 Moore William Fisk Elham 2a 967. Deaths Dec 1953 Fisk-Moore William 71 Claro 2c 98.) living as boarders in a house in Canterbury, Kent suggesting birth dates in 1876 and 1881 respectively. Both were born in Folkestone, Kent. It gives their occupation as photographers.

== Business ==
The business traded in Canterbury at 4 St. Georges Gate, 7 St. George's Place and 10c Burgate Street. After many years of trading the partnership was dissolved in 1942 by mutual consent.

== Legacy ==
Images attributed to B&W Fisk-Moore appear in the collections of major galleries. The National Portrait Gallery holds two vintage bromide prints one of Bishop Albert William Lee the other of Bishop Alfred Carey Wollaston Rose. The British Museum holds a postcard size image, possibly a gelatin silver print of Tanzanian women in a rural setting.

Beaufort and William's names appear in the Hewlett Johnson Papers held at the University of Kent.

Within the Conway Library Collection of photographs at the Courtauld Institute of Art there are images attributed to B&W Fisk-Moore. The collection includes glass and film negatives as well as prints covering different time periods of mainly architectural images. The collection is currently in the process of being digitised as part of the wider Courtauld Connects project.
