= Anthony Hunter =

Anthony or Tony Hunter may refer to:

- Anthony R. Hunter (born 1943), British-American biologist
- Anthony Hunter (bishop) (1916–2002), Anglican bishop of Swaziland
- Tony Hunter (tight end) (born 1960), former American football tight end
- Tony Hunter (running back) (born 1963), former American football running back
- Tony Hunter (wide receiver) (born 1963), former Canadian football wide receiver
