= Peter Harker =

South African bishop (died 2016)

Peter Harker (died 16 December 2016) was bishop of Zululand from 1993 until 1997.

Harker was educated at the University of Leeds and the College of the Resurrection, Mirfield; and ordained in 1952. After a curacy at St James, Durban he was at Isandlwana from 1957 to 1963. He was archdeacon of West Zululand from 1963 to 1965; East Zululand from 1965 to 1967; and South Zululand from 1967 to 1979; and East Zululand from 1979 to 1993. Subsequent to this he served in kwaMagwaza followed by stints in Melmoth and Empangeni. He did a nine-month exchange with the vicar of St Cuthberts North Wembley in the Diocese of London. He was later appointed sub-dean of the Cathedral of the Holy Nativity, Pietermaritzburg. He was then appointed successively as the rector of All Saints United Church in Pietermaritzburg; St. Cyprian's, Durban; and Scottburgh where he also served an archdeacon of the South Coast. In 1996 he was consecrated as bishop of Zululand, the seat being in Eshowe. He retired to Ballito on the North Coast at the age of 70 and died in his 89-year, on his 57th wedding anniversary. His widow Rosemary, plays the organ at All Saints Church, Maidstone, KwaZulu-Natal, where Harker served as a priest, from time to time, during his retirement.

== Notes ==
- Duffett, Paul S. (2007). Collared by God. kenandglen.com. ISBN 978-0-9556753-3-1.

Anglican Church of Southern Africa titles
Preceded by Lawrence Zulu	Bishop of Zululand; 1997–2005	Succeeded by Anthony Mdletshe
