= Charles Aylen =

Anglican bishop

The Right Reverend Charles A. W. Aylen
- Bishop of St Helena
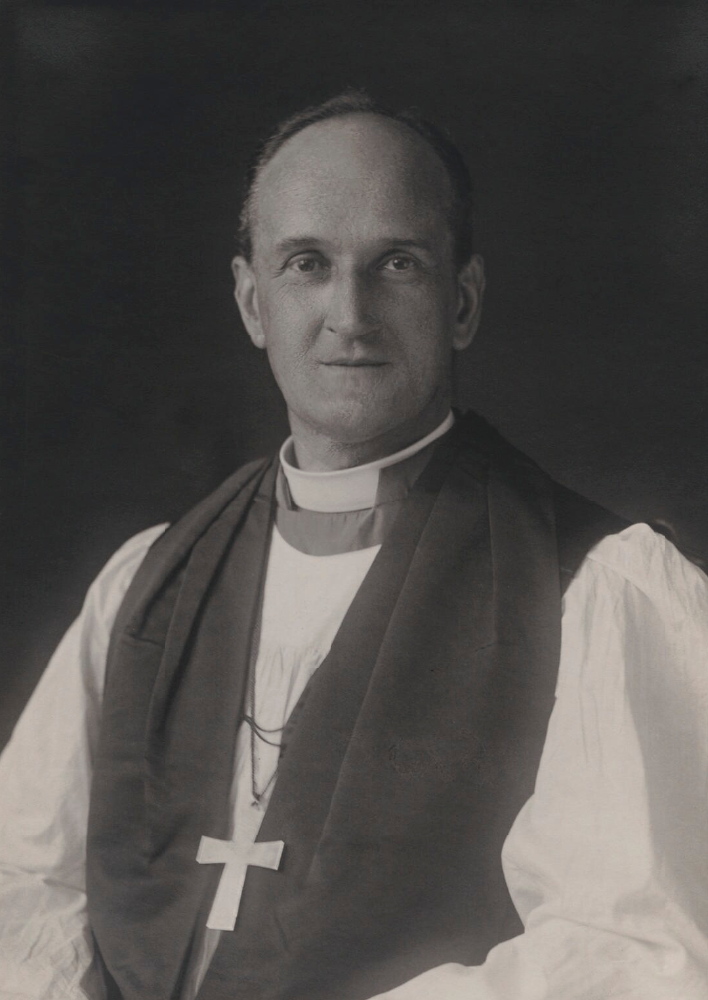
- C.A.W. Aylen, 1930
- Church: Anglican
- Province: Southern Africa
- Diocese: St Helena and Zululand

Personal details
- Born: 1882 Wick, Scotland
- Died: 15 August 1972 (aged 89–90)

Charles Arthur William Aylen (1882 – 15 August 1972) was an Anglican bishop.

== Education ==
Aylen was born in Wick, Scotland. He was educated at Bradfield College and Keble College, Oxford.

== Career ==
He was ordained in 1906 and his first post was a curacy in Henley on Thames.

He was vicar of Shiplake from 1913 to 1925. During World War I he was a Royal Navy chaplain. He became a temporary chaplain in July 1916, and served on HMS St. Vincent. He was recognised as an officer of exceptional ability, a 'very fine example of all that a Chaplain should or could be'

In 1926 he went to Empangeni in the Diocese of Zululand as a missionary priest. He was the bishop of Zululand from 1930 to 1935. While he was bishop of Zululand he married Elizabeth Hills. He was translated to the Diocese of St Helena and was bishop there from 1935 to 1939.

He was vicar of Aston Tirrold from 1939 to 1945 and Flore from 1945 to 1958 and rural dean of Weedon from 1947 to 1951. He was also a non-residentiary Canon of Peterborough (1946–1961) and an Assistant Bishop of Peterborough (1950–1963).

== Family ==
He married Elisabeth Margaret Anna Hills in 1932 and they had two sons and one daughter.

== Notes ==
Anglican Church of Southern Africa titles
Preceded by Wilmot Vyvyan	Bishop of Zululand; 1930–1935	Succeeded by Albert Lee
Preceded by Christopher Watts	Bishop of St Helena; 1935–1939	Succeeded by Gilbert Turner
