= Dalcy Badeli Dlamini =

Swazi Anglican bishop

The Right Reverend Dalcy Badeli Dlamini
- Bishop of Eswatini
- Church: Anglican Church of Southern Africa
- Diocese: Eswatini
- Elected: 2021
- Predecessor: Ellinah Wamukoya

Orders
- Ordination: 2006 (diaconate); 2008 (priesthood)
- Consecration: 2022

Personal details
- Born: Dalcy Nsibande
- Education: University of Pretoria (M.A., 2017; PhD, 2020)

Dalcy Badeli Dlamini (née Nsibande) is a Swazi Anglican bishop. Since 2022, she has been bishop of Eswatini in the Anglican Church of Southern Africa. She was elected in 2021 to succeed Bishop Ellinah Wamukoya.

Dlamini was consecrated in 2022 and has been served on the ecumenical Anglican/Lutheran Commission and the steering group for the International Anglican Women’s Network. She was one of five African women bishops to attend the enthronement of Sarah Mullally as archbishop of Canterbury in March 2026.
