= A. Andrews =

American politician

Member of the Minnesota House of Representatives from the 20th district
- In office 1867–1868
- Succeeded by: A. B. Colton

Personal details
- Born: c. 1818 Connecticut
- Party: Republican
- Occupation: Farmer, legislator

A. Andrews (born c. 1818) was an American state representative for Minnesota's 20th district serving Cottonwood, Faribault, Jackson, Martin, Murray, Pipestone, and Rock counties. He served in the Minnesota House of Representatives' 9th Legislature from 1867 to 1868. While in the state house, he served on the Incorporations, Indian Affairs, and Railroads committees. He was succeeded by A. B. Colton. Andrews came to Minnesota in 1864 and was a resident of Fairmont, Minnesota when he was elected in 1866.
