= Tom Savage (bishop) =

Bishop of Zululand (1900–1966)

Thomas Joseph Savage was an Anglican bishop in the third quarter of the 20th century.

Born on 5 February 1900, and educated at Chigwell School, Highgate and Peterhouse, he was ordained in 1927. Following a curacy at St John’s, Waterloo Road he worked at the South African Church Railway Mission and was then a Toc H padre. After a spell as rector of Springs, Transvaal he was vicar of Leominster then Tait Missioner for the Diocese of Canterbury. In 1955 he was appointed dean of Cape Town and three years later bishop of Zululand, a post he held to his death on 22 October 1966.

== Styles and titles ==
- Mr Thomas Savage ( -1927)
- The Revd Thomas Savage (1927 - 1955)
- The Very Revd Thomas Savage (1955 - 1958)
- The Rt Revd Thomas Savage (1958 - 1966)

== Notes ==
Anglican Church of Southern Africa titles
Preceded by Michael Gibbs	Dean of Cape Town; 1955 – 1958	Succeeded by Edward King
Preceded by Eric Joseph Trapp	Bishop of Zululand; 1958 – 1966	Succeeded by Alphaeus Hamilton Zulu
