= Eric Trapp =

The Right Reverend Eric Joseph Trapp
- Bishop of Bermuda
- Church: Anglican
- Diocese: Bermuda
- In office: 1970–1975
- Previous posts: Bishop of Zululand (1947–1957); Secretary of the SPG (1957–1970)

Orders
- Consecration: 1947

Personal details
- Born: Eric Joseph Trapp; 17 July 1910
- Died: 8 September 1993 (aged 83)
- Denomination: Anglican
- Education: Alderman Newton's School, Leicester; College of the Resurrection, Mirfield
- Alma mater: University of Leeds

Eric Joseph Trapp (17 July 1910 – 8 September 1993) was an Anglican bishop in the mid-20th century.

== Early life ==
Born on 17 July 1910 and educated at Alderman Newton's School in Leicester, and then at Leeds University, he studied at the College of the Resurrection, Mirfield to prepare for ordination.

== Ordained ministry ==
He was ordained in 1935. Following a curacy at St Olave's, Mitcham, he emigrated to South Africa where he was director of the Masite Mission, Basutoland, then rector of St Augustine's Bethlehem, Orange Free State. Next he was rector of St John's, Maseru, then a canon of Bloemfontein Cathedral.

He was appointed to the episcopate as the seventh bishop of Zululand in 1947, a post he held for ten years. He was then secretary of the SPG until 1970 when he was appointed the fifth bishop of Bermuda, a post he held for five years.

In retirement he served as an assistant bishop within the Diocese of St Albans. He died on 8 September 1993.

Anglican Church of Southern Africa titles
| Preceded by Albert Lee | Bishop of Zululand; 1947–1957 | Succeeded by Tom Savage |
Anglican Communion titles
| Preceded by John Armstrong | Bishop of Bermuda; 1970–1975 | Succeeded by Robert Stopford |
