= William Carter (bishop) =

The Most Reverend William Carter KCMG
- Archbishop of Cape Town
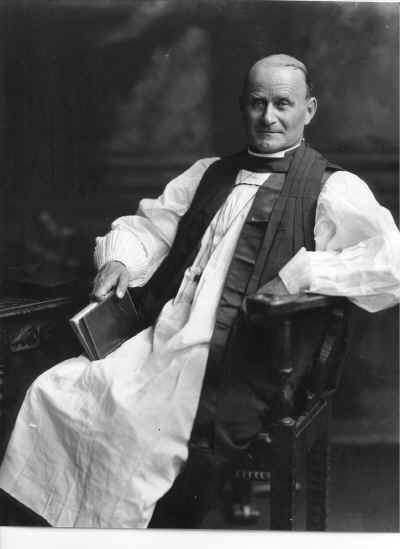
- Carter, photographed in 1908
- Province: Church of the Province of Southern Africa
- In office: 1909 to 1930
- Predecessor: William West Jones
- Opposed to: Francis Phelps
- Other posts: Bishop of Zululand (1891–1902); Bishop of Pretoria (1902–1909)

Orders
- Ordination: 1874
- Consecration: 29 September 1891

Personal details
- Born: July 1850
- Died: 14 February 1941 (aged 90)
- Denomination: Anglicanism
- Education: Pembroke College, Oxford

The Most Reverend William Marlborough Carter, KCMG (1850–1941) was an Anglican bishop and archbishop in South Africa.

== Family and education ==
Dr Carter was born on 11 July 1850, the son of the Rev. William Adolphus Carter, and nephew of the Rev. Canon T. T. Carter. He was educated at Eton and Pembroke College, Oxford. He was married to Hester Marion Rose, C.B.E. in London in 1904. He died on 14 Feb 1941 at Bear Ash, Twyford, Berkshire, and was buried at Eton College.

His brother, Thomas Nevile Carter, played football for England in the second unofficial football match against Scotland, in November 1870.

== Clerical career ==
Dr Carter was ordained in 1874. He held curacies at Christ Church, West Bromwich and All Saints, Bakewell. He was secretary to the Eton Mission in Hackney until his appointment to the episcopate as Bishop of Zululand in 1891. He was consecrated a bishop at St Paul's Cathedral on 29 September 1891, by Edward Benson, Archbishop of Canterbury. He was translated to Pretoria after a unanimous election in the Episcopalian Assembly there in August 1902, and then to Cape Town in 1909 until 1930. He died on 14 February 1941.

== Commemoration ==
There is a memorial to him at St. George's Cathedral, Cape Town. Carter House at Herschel Girls' School is named in his honour, as he was archbishop when the school was founded and a member of the first school council.

== Notes and references ==
- Hogarth, Oswald James; White, Ralph Layard (1952). The Life of William Marlborough Carter, Third Archbishop of Capetown: 'Eton's Gift to South Africa'. O.J. Hogarth.

Anglican Church of Southern Africa titles
Preceded by Douglas MacKenzie	Bishop of Zululand; 1891 – 1902	Succeeded by Wilmot Lushington Vyvyan
Preceded by Henry Brougham Bousfield	Bishop of Pretoria; 1902 – 1909	Succeeded by Michael Bolton Furse
Preceded by William West Jones	Archbishop of Cape Town; 1909 – 1930	Succeeded by Francis Robinson Phelps
