= Anselm Genders =

British-born Anglican bishop of Bermuda (1919–2008)

Anselm Genders CR, born Roger Marson Genders and also added the name of Alban when he joined the Royal Navy (15 August 1919 – 19 June 2008), was the Bishop of Bermuda from 1977 until 1982.

Genders was educated at King Edward VI Grammar School, Birmingham and Brasenose College, Oxford during which time his studies were interrupted by wartime service with the Royal Naval Volunteer Reserve.

After graduation Genders taught briefly at Dame Allan's School (where he succeeded South African theologian John Suggitt) and then began a long association with the College of the Resurrection, Mirfield, becoming a monk in 1952. In 1955 he was sent as a tutor to Codrington College, Barbados eventually becoming its principal. A decade later he was sent to Rhodesia, working first in Penhalonga before being appointed Archdeacon of Manicaland.

In 1977, Donald Coggan, Archbishop of Canterbury, asked him accept the Bermuda bishopric vacated by the death of Robert Stopford. Genders was ordained a bishop on 18 October 1977, by Coggan at St Paul's Cathedral. Five turbulent years later he returned to the College of the Resurrection where he remained for 26 years until his death.

== Notes and references ==
Church of England titles
Preceded by Robert Stopford	Bishop of Bermuda; 1977–1982	Succeeded by Christopher Charles Luxmoore
