= Ellinah Wamukoya =

Swazi bishop (1951–2021)

The Right Reverend Ellinah Wamukoya
- Bishop of Swaziland
- Church: Anglican Church of Southern Africa
- Diocese: Diocese of Swaziland
- Elected: 18 July 2012
- Successor: Dalcy Badeli Dlamini

Orders
- Consecration: 17 November 2012 by Thabo Makgoba

Personal details
- Born: 1951 Swaziland Protectorate
- Died: 19 January 2021 (aged 69–70) Eswatini
- Denomination: Anglicanism

Ellinah Ntombi Wamukoya (1951 – 19 January 2021) was a Swazi Anglican bishop.

In 2012, she was elected as the diocesan bishop of the Anglican Diocese of Swaziland and she kept this position until her death in 2021. She was the first woman to be elected as a bishop of the Anglican Church of Southern Africa and of the whole African continent. In 2016, she was listed as one of BBC's 100 Women.

== Early life ==
Wamukoya studied at the universities of Botswana, Lesotho, and Eswatini. She was the chaplain of the University of Eswatini and of St. Michael's High School, in Manzini, as well as Town Clerk and CEO of the City Council of Manzini when she was elected.

== Becoming a bishop ==
Wamukoya was not initially a candidate to succeed Meshack Mabuza as Anglican Bishop of Swaziland, but after seven rounds of inconclusive elections she was elected by a 2/3 majority of the members of the Elective Assembly on 18 July 2012. She was consecrated on 17 November 2012 by Archbishop Thabo Makgoba, who called it a "a great occasion". No official representative of Swazi king Mswati III attended the ceremony. The ceremony had been led by David Dinkebogile, who said that Wamukoya was a bishop, "not a black woman, not an African, not a Swazi woman" and "She was to be pastor to all, to men and women, to black and white, to Swazis and all others in her diocese".

Wamukoya later admitted that being the first female bishop in the Anglican church bore a great weight of responsibility and it was her responsibility to prove that women were suited to the role, adding "I know that the whole world is looking up to me to see if I will deliver." She visited Ireland in 2015, preaching at the St Macartin's Cathedral, Enniskillen on 25 January.

== Death ==
Wamukoya died of COVID-19 during the COVID-19 pandemic in Eswatini.

Anglican Church of Southern Africa titles
Preceded by Meshack Mabuza	Bishop of Swaziland; 2012–2021	Vacant
