= Robert Stopford (bishop) =

British Anglican bishop (1901–1976)

The Right Reverend and Right Honourable Robert Stopford KCVO CBE
- Bishop of Bermuda
- Diocese: Anglican Church of Bermuda
- Elected: 1976
- Predecessor: Eric Trapp
- Successor: Anselm Genders
- Previous posts: Bishop of Jerusalem (Vicar-General) 1974–1976; Bishop of London; 1961–1973; Bishop of Peterborough; 1956–1961; Bishop of Fulham; 1955–1956

Orders
- Consecration: c. 1974

Personal details
- Born: 20 February 1901 Garston, Lancashire, UK
- Died: 13 August 1976 (aged 75)
- Denomination: Anglican
- Education: Hertford College, Oxford

Robert Wright Stopford, KCVO, CBE (20 February 1901 – 13 August 1976) was a British Anglican bishop.

== Early life and education ==
Stopford was born in Garston, Merseyside (then in Lancashire) to John William Stopford, a timber merchant born in Galway, Ireland. He was educated at Coatham School in Redcar and Liverpool College, where he was Head of House (Littler's). He continued his education at Hertford College, Oxford, where he graduated with a Master of Arts degree. At Oxford he obtained first classes in classical honour moderations (1922) and modern history (1924). He was subsequently an Honorary Fellow of Hertford College, Oxford, and a Fellow of King's College London. He received a Doctor of Divinity degree from the University of London and a Doctor of Civil Law degree from the University of Durham. Stopford was married with two children.

== Ministry ==
- Michaelmas 1932 made deacon
- Michaelmas 1933 ordained priest
- 1932–1935 Chaplain, Oundle School
- 1935–1940 Principal of Trinity College (Kandy), Ceylon
- 1940–1946 Principal of Achimota College, Gold Coast
- 1946–1947 Rector of Chipping Barnet
- 1947–1955 Moderator—Secretary, Council of the Church Training Colleges
- 1952–1955 Honorary Chaplain to the Queen; General Secretary, the National Society; Secretary, the Schools Council
- 11 June 1955 consecrated bishop
- 1955–1956 Bishop suffragan of Fulham (jurisdiction: northern Europe)
- June 1956-1961 Bishop of Peterborough
- 1961–1973 Bishop of London (confirmed 25 September 1961; retired June 1973)
- 1961–1976 Privy Counsellor
- 17 October 1961 – 1973 Dean of Her Majesty's Chapels Royal.
- 1974–76 Vicar-General in Jerusalem
- 1975 Chairman of the D'Oyly Carte Opera Trust
- 8 February 1976: installed Bishop of Bermuda at Hamilton Cathedral

During his tenure as Bishop of London, Stopford formalised the system of assigning districts to the oversight of suffragans, adapted the diocese's organisation to the 1964 creation of Greater London, and initiated the 1970 experimental area scheme.

== Legacy ==
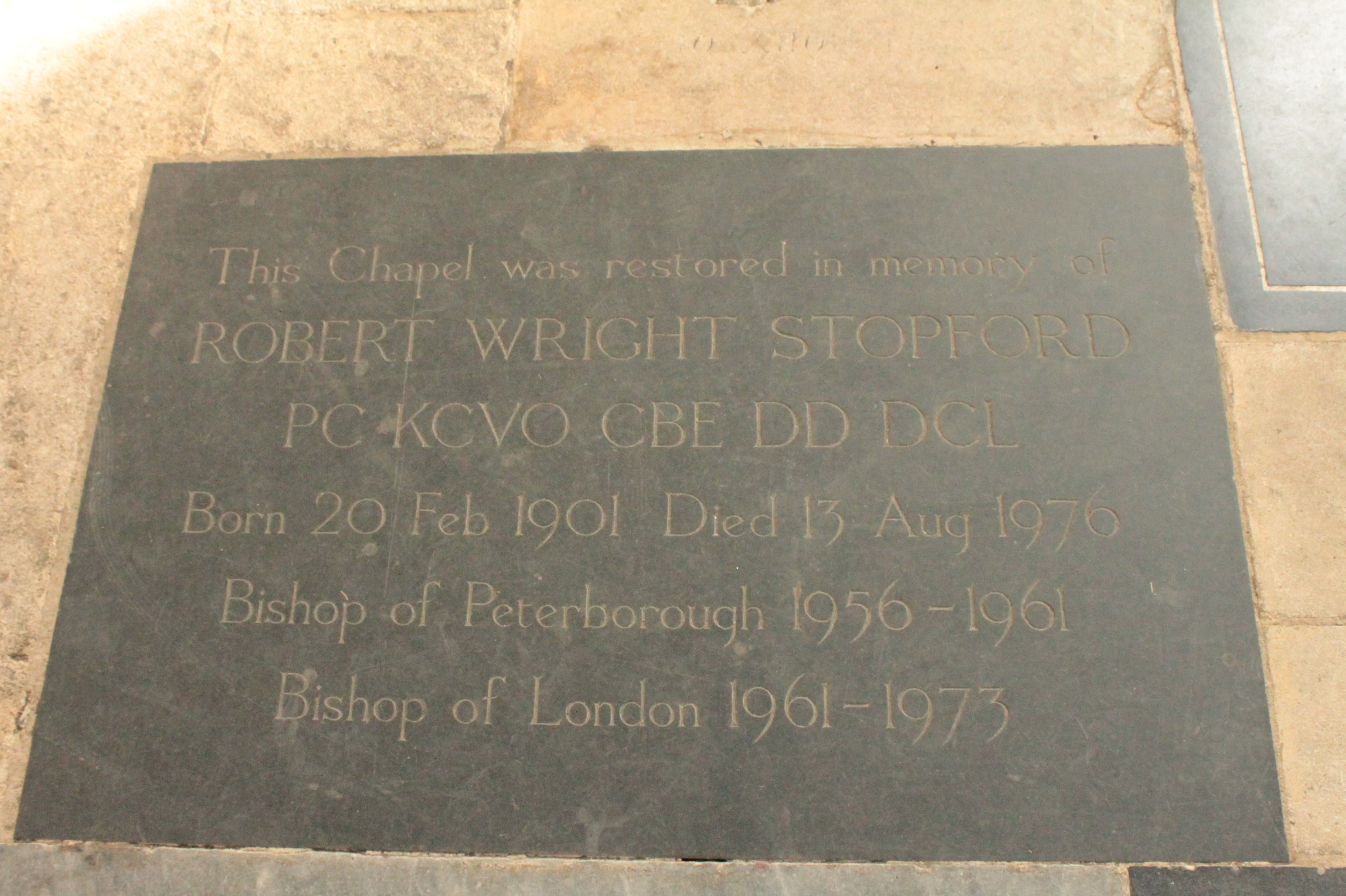
Memorial to Robert Wright Stopford, Peterborough Cathedral

Bishop Stopford's School in Enfield and Bishop Stopford School in Kettering are named after him. A boarding house, Stopford House, at Achimota School in Accra, Ghana, was named in his honour. He was appointed KCVO in 1973, shortly before he retired as Bishop of London

== See also ==
- Faik Haddad

Church of England titles
Preceded by George Ingle	Bishop of Fulham; 1955–1956	Succeeded by Roderic Coote
Preceded by Spencer Leeson	Bishop of Peterborough; 1956–1961	Succeeded by Cyril Easthaugh
Preceded by Henry Montgomery Campbell	Bishop of London; 1961–1973	Succeeded by Gerald Ellison
Anglican Communion titles
Preceded by George Appleton	Anglican Bishop in Jerusalem & Vicar-General; 1974–1976	Succeeded by Faik Haddad
Preceded by Eric Trapp	Bishop of Bermuda; 1976	Succeeded by Anselm Genders
