= Sir Henry Preston, 3rd Baronet =

English soldier, magistrate and footballer

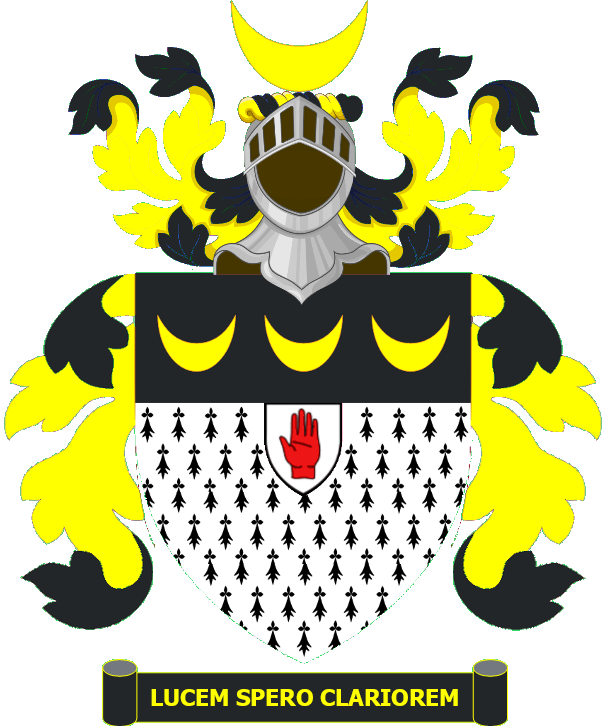
Arms

Sir Henry Jacob Preston, 3rd Baronet (15 September 1851 – 9 January 1897) was an English soldier, magistrate and footballer. He represented England in the second representative football match against Scotland in November 1870.

== Family ==
Preston was born at Beeston Hall, Beeston St Lawrence in Norfolk, the son of Sir Jacob Henry Preston, 2nd Baronet, and Amelia Prescott.

He married Mary Hope Clutterbuck on 16 December 1885; they had five children:

- Sir Jacob Preston, 4th Baronet (1887–1918), who succeeded him to the baronetcy.
- Sir Edward Hulton Preston, 5th Baronet (1888–1963), who succeeded his elder brother to the baronetcy.
- Thomas Frederick (1889–1917), who gained the rank of lieutenant in the Norfolk Yeomanry and joined the Royal Flying Corps. He was killed in Belgium during the First World War.
- Netty Louisa (born 1892), died an infant.
- Hope Amy Constance (1894–1956)

== Education and sport ==
Preston was educated at Eton College from 1865 to 1871, where he was a member of the school rowing VIII in 1870 and 1871, and of the cricket XI in 1871.

In November 1870, he and fellow Etonian Thomas Carter, were amongst six new recruits to the England football XI which played the second pseudo-international against a Scotland XI. The match was played at the Kennington Oval and ended in a 1–0 victory for the English, with fellow debutante R.S.F. Walker scoring the only goal twelve minutes from the end of the match.

After leaving Eton in 1871, he went up to University College, Oxford from where graduated with a Bachelor of Arts degree in 1876.

== Military and professional career ==
He was a member of The Prince of Wales's Own Norfolk Artillery reaching the rank of sub-lieutenant in August 1876 and being promoted to full lieutenant two years later.

He also held the office of Justice of the Peace. He succeeded to the title of "3rd Baronet Preston, of Beeston St. Lawrence, Norfolk" on 19 October 1891 on the death of his father. The family lived at Beeston Hall where Henry was recorded as resident in the 1861, 1871 and 1881 censuses; in the two earlier censuses he was described as a "scholar" and in 1881 as "Magistrate & Lieut. Militia". The family also owned the nearby Barton Hall at Barton Turf.

He died of scarlet fever and blood poisoning at Northrepps near Cromer, Norfolk on 9 January 1897, aged 45. There is a memorial plaque to Sir Henry and his father inside the Church of St. Lawrence at Beeston St Lawrence which also contains memorials to many other members of the Preston family.

Coat of arms of Sir Henry Preston, 3rd Baronet

Crest
A crescent Or.
Escutcheon
Ermine, on a chief sable three crescents Or.
Motto
Lucem Spero Clariorem (I Hope For A Bright Light)

Baronetage of the United Kingdom
Preceded by Jacob Henry Preston	Baronet (of Beeston St Lawrence); 1891–1897	Succeeded by Jacob Preston
