= Christopher Luxmoore =

Bishop of Bermuda (1926–2014)

- Bishop of Bermuda
- Church: Anglican
- Diocese: Bermuda
- In office: 1984–1989
- Predecessor: Anselm Genders
- Successor: Bill Down
- Other post: Archdeacon of Lewes & Hastings (1989–1991)

Orders
- Ordination: 1953
- Consecration: 1984

Personal details
- Born: Christopher Charles Luxmoore; 9 April 1926
- Died: 24 February 2014 (aged 87)
- Parents: William Cyril Luxmoore; Constance Evelyn Shoesmith
- Spouse: Judith Johnstone (m. 1955)

Christopher Charles Luxmoore (9 April 1926 – 24 February 2014) was the eighth Bishop of Bermuda.

== Life ==
He was the son of the Rev. William Cyril Luxmoore and his wife Constance Evelyn Shoesmith. He was educated at Sedbergh School and Trinity College, Cambridge, and was ordained in 1953. His first post was as a curate at St John the Baptist, Newcastle upon Tyne after which he was Priest in Charge of St Bede's, Newsham, County Durham. He was then Rector of Sangre Grande, Trinidad and after that Vicar of Headingley, Leeds. He was Precentor and Canon Residentiary of Chichester Cathedral from 1981 until his election to the See of Bermuda in 1984, and was the first ever Bishop to be consecrated there.

On his return to England in 1989, Luxmoore became Archdeacon of Lewes & Hastings, a post he held until retirement in 1991.

== Family ==
Luxmoore married in 1955 Judith Johnstone, daughter of canon Verney Johnstone; they had four sons and a daughter.

Church of England titles
| Preceded by Anselm Genders | Bishop of Bermuda; 1984 –1989 | Succeeded by William John Denbigh Down |
