= Douglas MacKenzie =

Anglican bishop

Douglas Mackenzie (died 9 January 1890) was an Anglican bishop in the second half of the 19th century.

He was educated at St Albans School and Peterhouse, Cambridge. A noted mathematician, he served simultaneously as principal of St. Andrew's School, Bloemfontein, archdeacon of Harrismith and a canon of Bloemfontein Cathedral before his appointment as the second bishop of Zululand. He remained bishop of Zululand until his death from fever in January 1890. After his death a memorial to him was erected at St Peter's, Raunds.

Anglican Church of Southern Africa titles
Preceded by Edward Wilkinson	Bishop of Zululand; 1880–1890	Succeeded by William Carter
