= Alpheus Quicy =

American stonemason

Alpheus Quicy (1774–1875) was an American stonemason who built a number of houses and other buildings in Connecticut.

Quicy, whose surname is sometimes misspelled as "Quincy," was a free Black man. He is credited with building various structures around Connecticut in the 1800s, including at least two stone houses in Manchester, Connecticut −- the Trebbe house on East Center Street and the Walter Bunce house on Bidwell Street − and portions of the Collins Axe Company factory buildings in Canton, Connecticut. The Bunce House, the only private home built by Quicy that is still known to be standing, is part of the Connecticut Freedom Trail.

Quicy and his wife, Joanna, are buried in West Cemetery in Manchester, Connecticut.

== Gallery ==
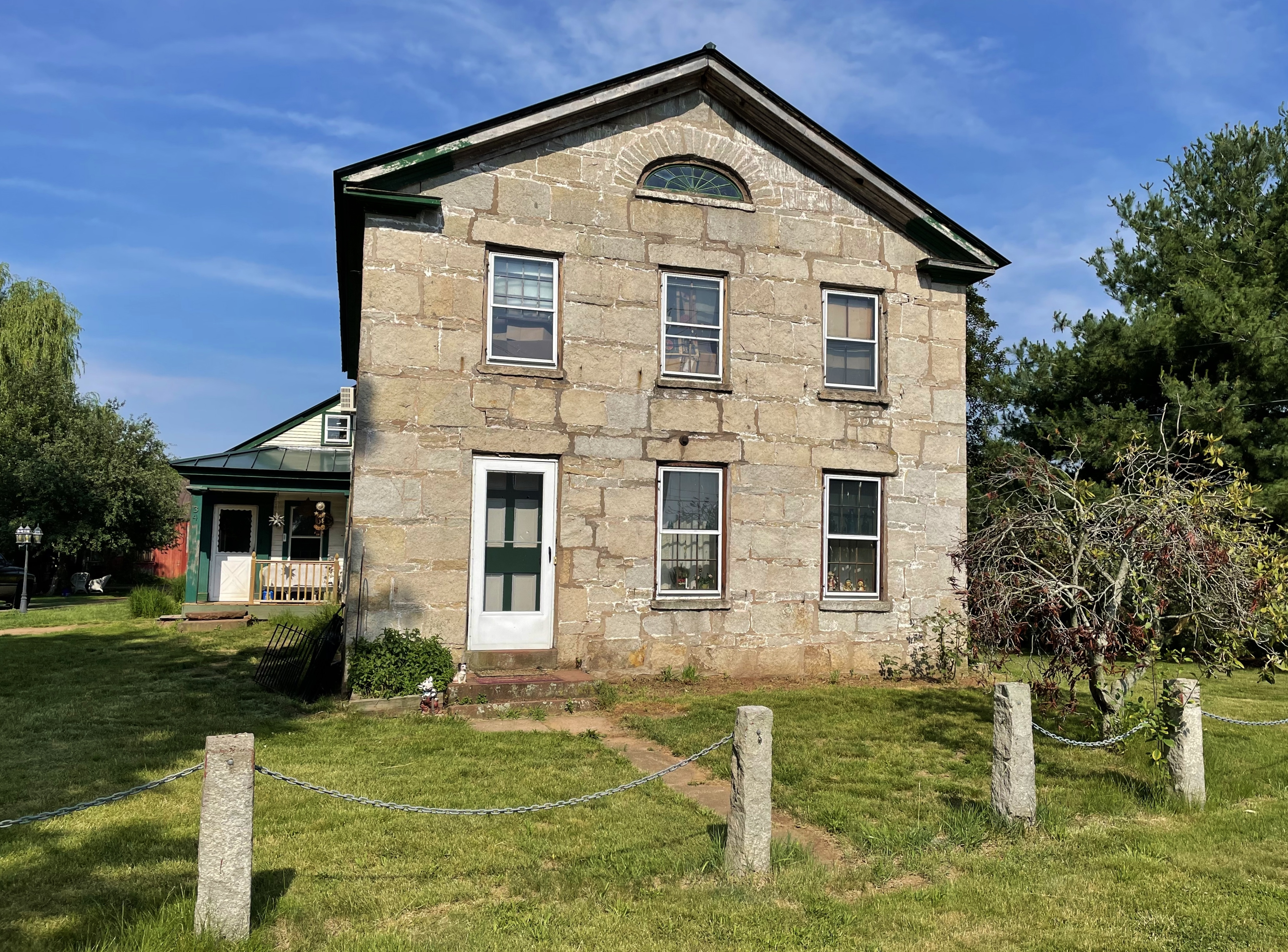
Walter Bunce House, Manchester, Connecticut (built by Alpheus Quicy circa 1821-1830)

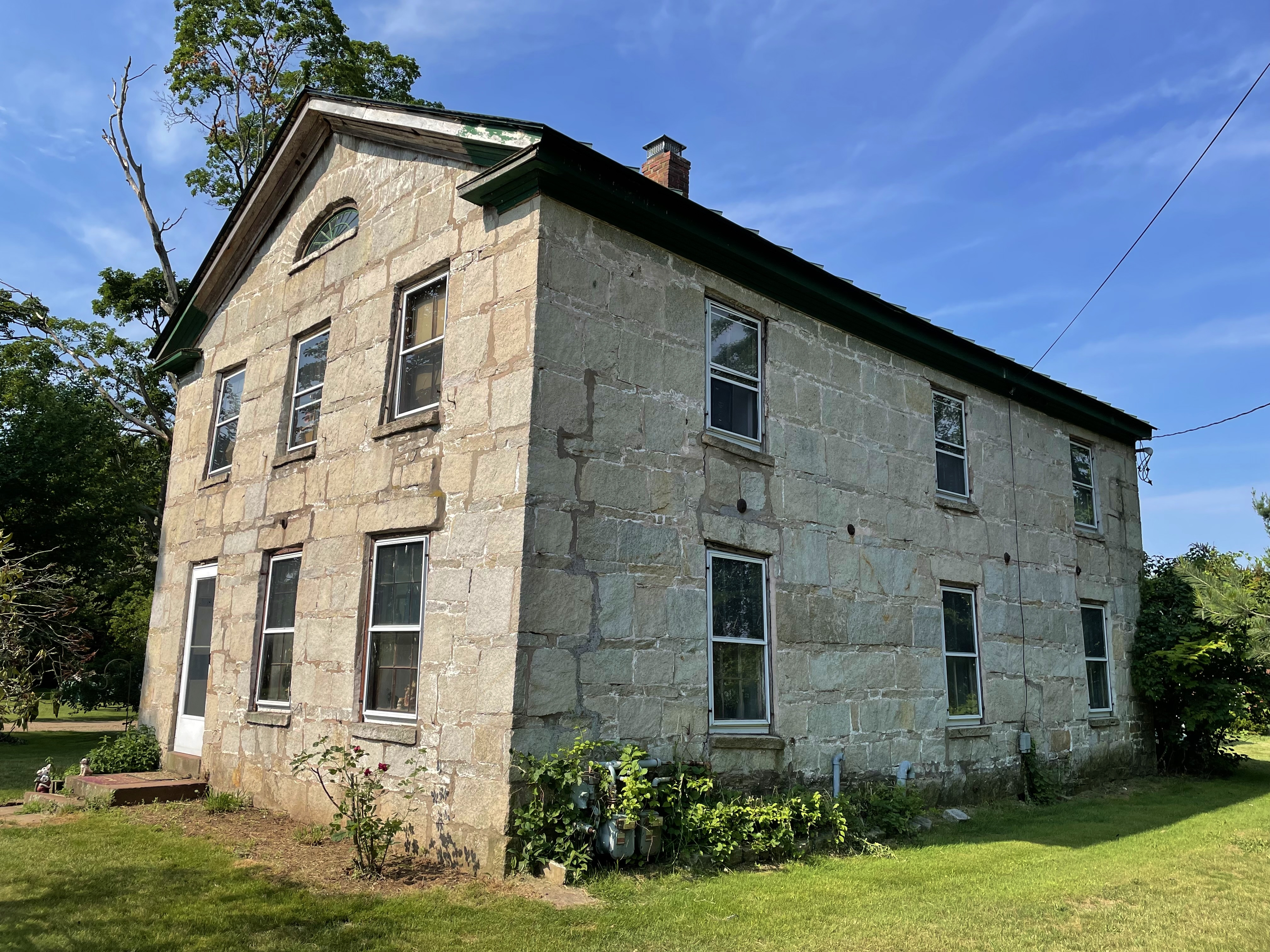
Walter Bunce House (side view)

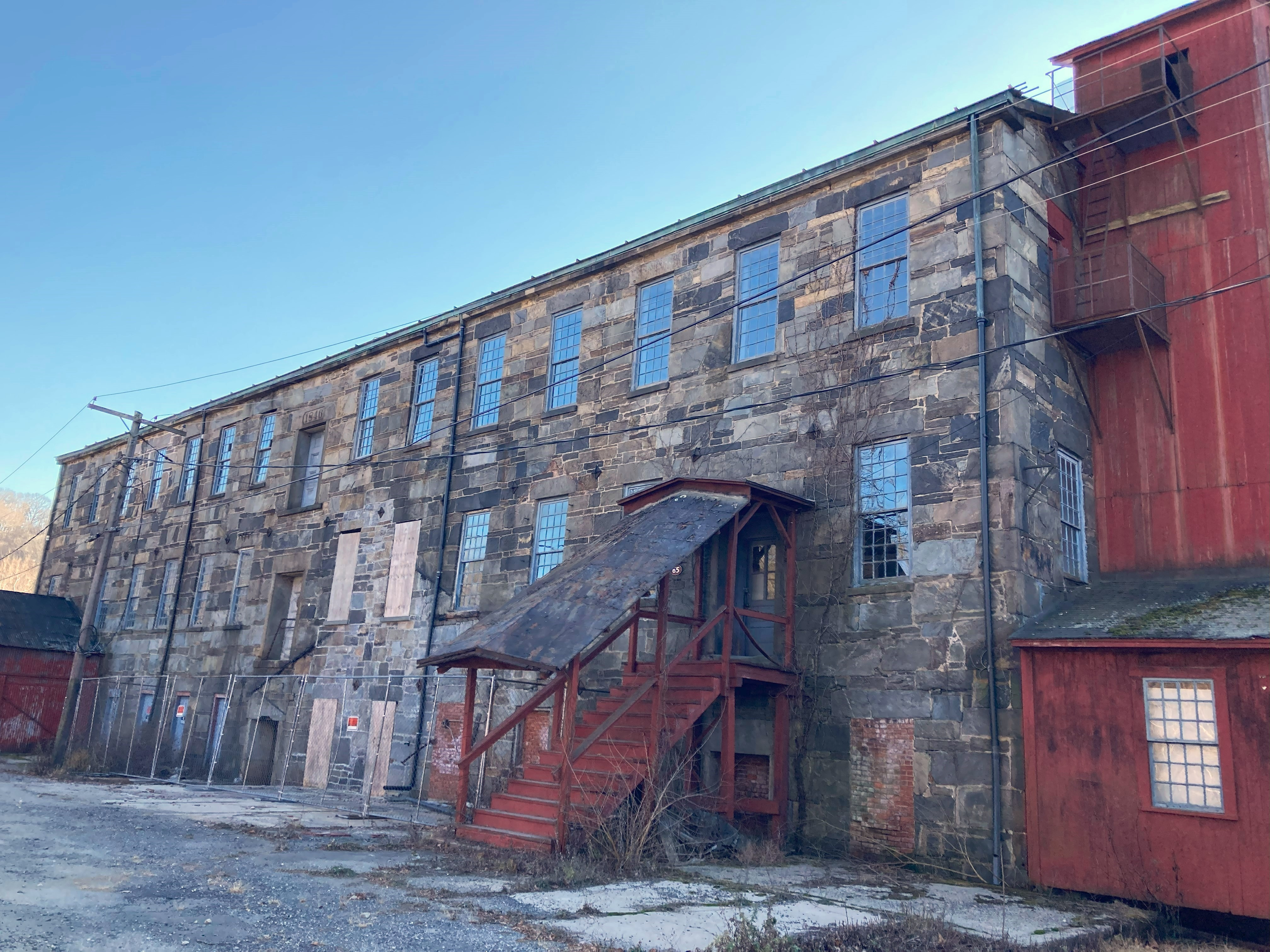
Collins Axe Company factory

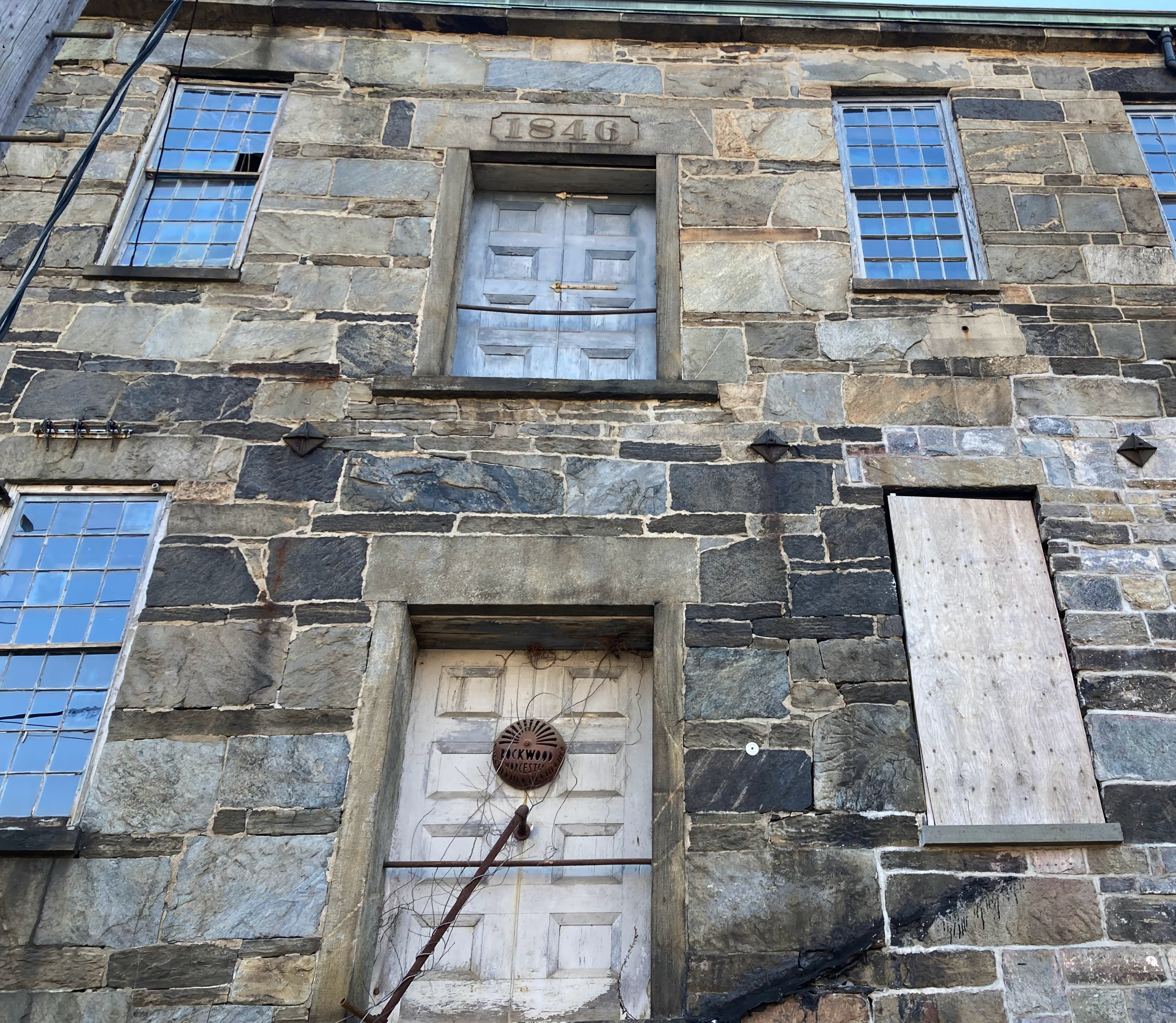
Stonework exterior of Collins Axe Company factory

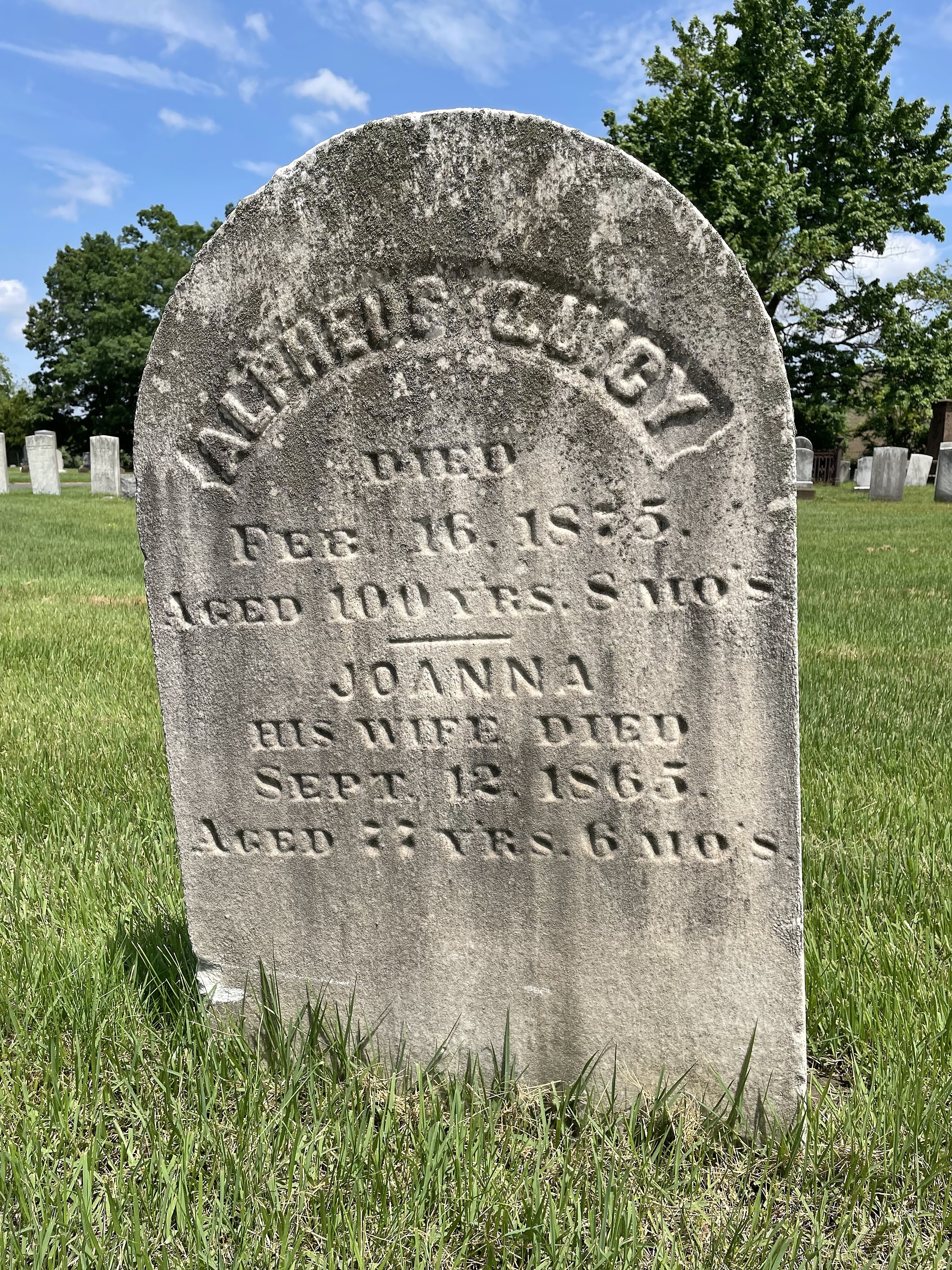
Quicy's headstone, Manchester, Connecticut
