= Walsham le Willows =

Village in Suffolk, England

Coordinates: 52.303°N 0.938°E

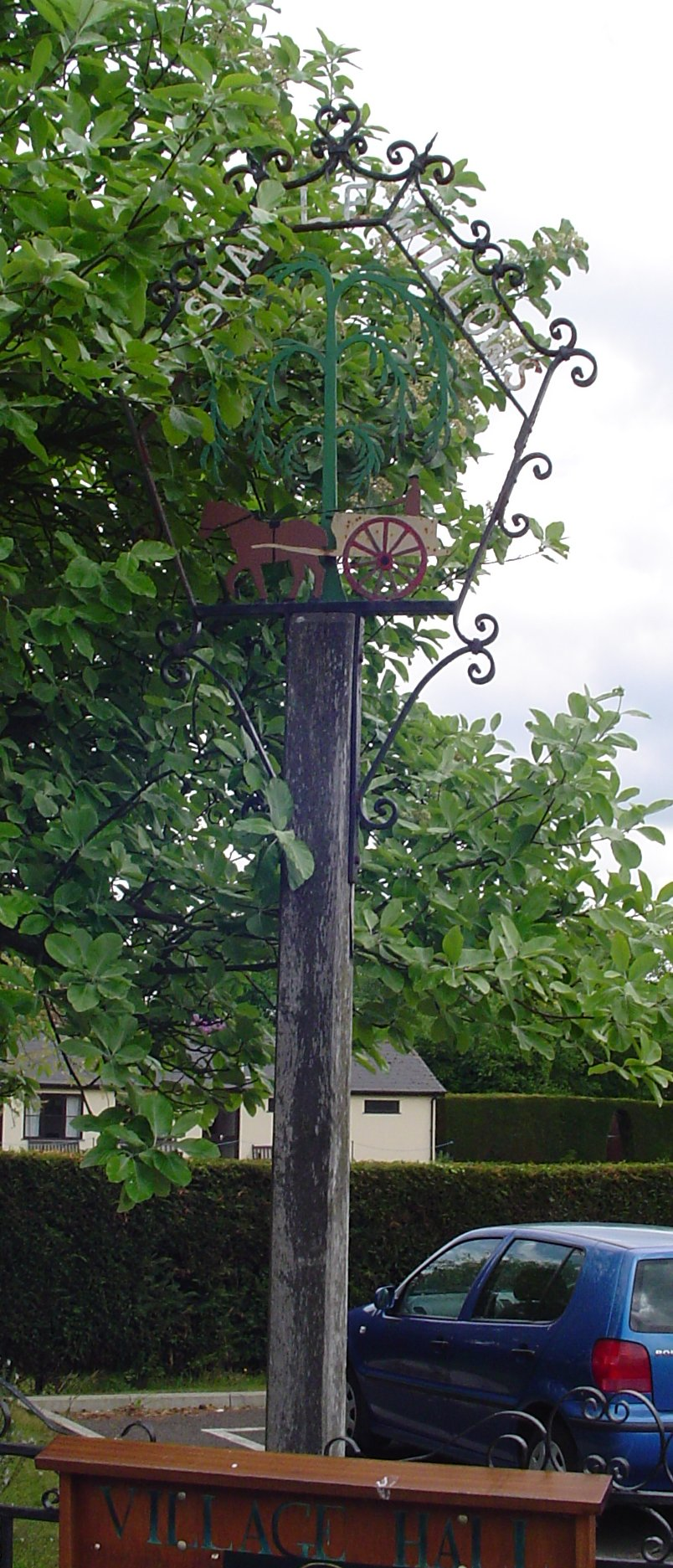
- Village sign of Walsham le Willows

- Location within Suffolk
- Population: 1,213 (2011)
- OS grid reference: TM004713
- Civil parish: Walsham-le-Willows
- District: Mid Suffolk
- Shire county: Suffolk
- Region: East
- Country: England
- Sovereign state: United Kingdom
- Post town: BURY ST EDMUNDS
- Postcode district: IP31
- Dialling code: 01359
- UK Parliament: Waveney Valley

Walsham le Willows is a village and civil parish in the Mid Suffolk district, in Suffolk, England, located around 3 miles (4 km) south-east of Stanton. Queen Elizabeth I granted Walsham le Willows to Nicholas Bacon, Lord Keeper of the Great Seal, in 1559. In 2011 the parish had a population of 1213.

Because the village is documented unusually fully in surviving records of the time, the Cambridge historian John Hatcher chose to use it as the setting for his semi-fictionalised account of the effects of the mid-14th century plague epidemic in England, The Black Death: A Personal History (2008).

Sacrifice Pole

Dating from ancient time, a wooden beam has been stored in buildings around the village. Each year, at the start of February, around the time of Imbolc the wood is moved to a new building. The name Sacrifice Pole may relate to the era of plague but, equally, may not.

== Sport and leisure ==
Walsham le Willows has a Non-League football club Walsham-le-Willows F.C. currently in the Eastern Counties League who play at Summer Road.

== Sources ==
- Kenneth Melton Dodd (editor), The Field-Book of Walsham-le-Willows 1577 (Ipswich: Suffolk Records Society, 1974).
