= A. B. Colton =

American politician (born 1831)

Alpheus B. Colton

Member of the Minnesota House of Representatives from the 20th district
- In office January 7, 1868 – January 4, 1869
- Preceded by: A. Andrews
- Succeeded by: James W. Hunter

Personal details
- Born: 1831 Vermont, U.S.
- Party: Republican
- Occupation: Farmer; politician

Alpheus B. Colton (born 1831) was an American politician from Minnesota. He was a member of the Minnesota House of Representatives, representing 20th district, from 1868 to 1869.

== Early life ==
Alpheus B. Colton was born in Vermont in 1831 and moved to Minnesota in 1855.

== Career ==
Colton worked as a farmer in Winnebago.

Colton was a Republican. He served as a member of the Minnesota House of Representatives, representing the 20th district, from 1868 to 1869. He was preceded by A. Andrews and succeeded by James W. Hunter. He was the chair of the elections committee and also served on the state prison and towns and counties committees. He was in favor of the Southern Minnesota Railroad.

== Personal life ==
Colton lived in Winnebago.
