= Alpheus T. Mason =

American legal scholar and biographer (1899–1989)

Alpheus Thomas Mason (September 18, 1899 – October 31, 1989) was an American legal scholar and biographer. He wrote several biographies of justices of the Supreme Court of the United States, including Louis Brandeis, Harlan F. Stone, and William Howard Taft.

Alpheus Thomas Mason was born on September 18, 1899, in Snow Hill, Maryland. He graduated from Dickinson College with an AB in 1920 and an AM and PhD from Princeton University in 1921 and 1923, respectively. At Princeton, he grew close with Edward Samuel Corwin, who "became [his] mentor and also his benefactor and friend".

Mason was on the Duke University faculty for two years after receiving his PhD. In 1925, he came back to Princeton where he remained until his retirement in 1968. At Princeton, he held the McCormick chair and was named the McCormick Professor of Jurisprudence when he retired. He continued teaching at other colleges and universities until 1980.

He died on October 31, 1989, at his home in Princeton, New Jersey.

== Publications ==
- Organized Labor and the Law (1925)
- Brandeis: Lawyer and Judge in the Modern State (1933)
- Bureaucracy Convicts Itself: The Ballinger-Pinchot Controversy of 1910 (1941)
- The Brandeis Way (1938)
- Brandeis: A Free Man's Life (1946)
- Security through Freedom: American Political Thought and Practice (1955)
- Harlan Fiske Stone: Pillar of the Law (1956)
- The Supreme Court from Taft to Warren (1958)
- In Quest of Freedom: American Political Thought and Practice (1959)
- The Supreme Court: Palladium of Freedom (1962)
- The States Rights Debate: Antifederalism and the Constitution (1964, second edition 1972)
- William Howard Taft: Chief Justice (1964)

== Works cited ==
- Murphy, Walter F. (1997). "Alpheus Thomas Mason". In Marks, Patricia H. (ed.). Luminaries: Princeton Faculty Remembered. Princeton University Press. pp. 190–197. doi:10.1515/9781400864393.190. ISBN 978-1-4008-6439-3.
- Spillenger, Clyde (1993). "Lifting the Veil: The Judicial Biographies of Alpheus T. Mason". Reviews in American History. 21 (4): 723–734. doi:10.2307/2703420. ISSN 0048-7511. JSTOR 2703420.
