= Alpheus, West Virginia =

Unincorporated community in West Virginia, United States

Alpheus
- Unincorporated community
- Location within the state of West Virginia Alpheus (the United States)
- Coordinates: 37°22′5″N 81°33′39″W
- Country: United States
- State: West Virginia
- County: McDowell
- Elevation: 1,421 ft (433 m)
- Time zone: UTC-5 (Eastern (EST))
  - Summer (DST): UTC-4 (EDT)
- GNIS ID: 1560637

Alpheus is an unincorporated community in McDowell County, West Virginia, United States.
