= Alpheus Deane =

American baseball player

- Pitcher
- Born: October 11, 1916; Key West, Florida
- Died: June 22, 1986 (aged 69); Miami, Florida
- Threw: Right

Negro league baseball debut
- 1947, for the New York Black Yankees

Last appearance
- 1947, for the New York Black Yankees

Teams
- New York Black Yankees (1947)

Alpheus Elbridge Deane (October 11, 1916 – June 22, 1986) was an American Negro league pitcher in the 1940s.

A native of Key West, Florida, Deane played for the New York Black Yankees in 1947. He died in Miami, Florida in 1986 at age 69.
