= Dino Gabriel =

Italian-born South African Anglican bishop

The Right Reverend Dino Gabriel
- Bishop of Natal
- Church: Anglican
- Province: Southern Africa
- Diocese: Natal
- In office: 2015-2019
- Predecessor: Rubin Philip
- Previous post: bishop of Zululand

Orders
- Ordination: 1980
- Consecration: 2005 by Njongonkulu Ndungane

Personal details
- Born: 19 September 1955
- Died: 14 June 2025 (aged 69) Berea, Durban, South Africa

Dino Gabriel was an Italian-born Anglican bishop of Natal in South Africa. He had a Swazi wife and they have four children. He was fluent speaker of Zulu.

A former Roman Catholic priest, he came to South Africa as a missionary in 1987. He converted and was ordained an Anglican priest in 1992 in the Diocese of Highveld. He was the dean of the Zululand from 1999 to 2005, and was the bishop of Zululand from 2005 to 2015. He was translated to Natal on 22 November 2015 subsequent to his election on 16 July 2015.

In September 2019, after a tense and acrimonious meeting with the clergy of his diocese Gabriel tendered his resignation as bishop with immediate effect. Bishop Dino died on the 14 June 2025 in Parklands Hospital.

Anglican Church of Southern Africa titles
Preceded by Anthony Mdletshe	Bishop of Zululand; 2005–2015	Succeeded by Monument Makhanya
Preceded by Rubin Phillip	Bishop of Natal; 2015–2019	Vacant
