= Bernard Mkhabela =

The Right Reverend Bernard Mkhabela
- Church: Anglican
- Province: Southern Africa
- Diocese: Swaziland

Bernard Lazarus Nyoni Mkhabela was the second bishop of Swaziland.

Anglican Church of Southern Africa titles
Preceded by Anthony Hunter	Bishop of Swaziland; 1975-1993	Succeeded by Lawrence Bekisisa Zulu
