= Lawrence Zulu =

The Right Reverend Lawrence Zulu
- former Bishop of Swaziland
- Church: Anglican
- In office: 1993–2000
- Predecessor: Bernard Mkhabela
- Successor: Meshack Mabuza
- Previous post: Bishop of Zululand

Lawrence Bekisisa Zulu was a South African Anglican bishop.

== Personal life ==
Zulu went to Cambridge University and graduated with a BA in 1965 and an MA in 1969.

== Church life ==
Zulu was Bishop of Zululand, from 1975 to 1993, and Bishop of Swaziland, from 1993 to 2002.

He attended the Seventh General Assembly of the All Africa Conference of Churches.

== Notes and references ==
- Anon (1991). The Cambridge University List of Members for the Year ... Cambridge University Press.
- Anon (1992). The Church of England Yearbook. Church Information Office [and] Society for Promoting Christian Knowledge.
- Anon (1997). Seventh AACC Assembly report. All Africa Conference of Churches. ISBN 978-9966-886-27-9.
- Mbaya, Henry (August 2013), Apartheid: resistance and acquiescence. St Paul's Theological College, Grahamstown, 1973-1985, hdl:10500/11854
- Mbaya, Henry (2012). "Ungusobaba (you are our father): the life of an Anglican bishop, Lawrence Bekisisa Zulu (1937-2013+)". Studia Historiae Ecclesiasticae. 38 (2): 247–271. hdl:10500/8124.
- Denis, Philippe (1995). The Making of an Indigenous Clergy in Southern Africa: Proceedings of the International Conference, Held at the University of Natal, Pietermaritzburg, 25-27 October 1994. Cluster Publications. ISBN 978-1-875053-06-3.
- News Brief (Press release), 15 April 1976

Anglican Church of Southern Africa titles
Preceded by Bernard Mkhabela	Bishop of Swaziland; 1993–2000	Succeeded by Meshack Mabuza
Preceded by Alpheus Zulu	Bishop of Zululand; 1975–1993	Succeeded by Peter Harker
