= Diocese of Zululand =

Anglican diocese in South Africa

Location
- Ecclesiastical province: Southern Africa

Statistics
- Parishes: 55

Information
- Rite: Anglican
- Cathedral: Cathedral of St Michael and All Angels in Eshowe

Current leadership
- Bishop: Vikinduku Mnculwane

Website
- www.zululanddiocese.co.za

The Diocese of Zululand is a diocese of the Anglican Church of Southern Africa which covers the part of the South African province of KwaZulu-Natal that lies to the northeast of the Buffalo and Tugela Rivers. It is divided in ten archdeaconries.

== History ==
The establishment of the Anglican Diocese of Zululand has its roots in the visit of John Colenso, bishop of Natal, to King Mpande kaSenzangakhona in 1859 to secure his permission for a Zulu Mission. Permission was granted by Mpande who gave Colenso land at KwaMagwaza for the establishment of a mission station.

In 1860, Colenso sent Robert Robertson from Umlazi Mission outside Durban, to start work at KwaMagwaza. As controversy raged in England, the South African bishops headed by Bishop Robert Gray pronounced Colenso's deposition in December 1863. After Colenso had been deposed, Robertson refused to continue to accept him as Bishop of Natal. In 1870 on the 8 May, at the Whitehall Chapel in London, Edward Wilkinson was consecrated as the first bishop of the new diocese. He was given the title of Bishop for the Zulus and the tribes towards the Zambezi.

The bishop settled at KwaMagwaza. From there he trekked north, establishing missions in Swaziland and in Mpumalanga on his way to Pretoria. The Anglo-Zulu War of 1879 saw all the mission buildings in Zululand burned to the ground, as well as a decisive Zulu victory against the British at the Battle of Isandlwana. KwaMagwaza became lawless. The diocesan centre was removed to Isandlwana. The second bishop, Douglas MacKenzie (1880), also made Isandlwana his headquarters and set up a training college there. The Cathedral of St. Michael and All Angels is located in Eshowe.

== The diocese today ==
Today the Diocese of Zululand comprises 283 congregations – from the Tugela River in the South to the borders of Mozambique and Swaziland in the North, and inland to the Diocese of the Highveld. Each parish has a number of out stations and the diocese is served both by a large number of committed priests and by the Sisters of the Holy Name, a community of Zulu nuns.

== List of bishops ==
Diocese of Zululand

- Edward Wilkinson 1870–1875
- Douglas MacKenzie 1880–1890
- William Carter 1891–1902
- Wilmot Vyvyan 1903–1929
- Charles Aylen 1930–1935
- Albert Lee 1935–1947
- Eric Trapp 1947–1957
- Tom Savage 1958–1966
- Alphaeus Zulu 1966–1975
- Lawrence Bekisisa Zulu 1975–1993
- Peter Harker 1993–1997
- Anthony Mdletshe 1997–2005
- Dino Gabriel 2005–2015
- Monument Makhanya 2016 -2019
- Vikinduku Mnculwane 2021

== Coat of arms ==
The diocese assumed arms around the time of its inception, and had them granted by the College of Arms in 1954 : Sable, a bamboo cross eradicated at the foot proper, on a canton Azure bordered Argent a mullet also Argent, a base Vert charged with an anchor Or.
