= Cathedral of St Michael and All Angels, Eshowe =

Church in Eshowe, South Africa

Coordinates: 28°53′17″S 31°26′53″E

St Michael and All Angels Cathedral is an Anglican church on Eshowe, South Africa. The current incumbent is the Very Reverend Sabelo Sibangani Mncwango, the Dean of the Diocese of Zululand and Archdeacon of Eshowe.
