= Alphaeus Zulu =

Alphaeus Hamilton Zulu (29 July 1905 – 26 August 1987) was an Anglican bishop in the second half of the 20th century. Educated at the University of South Africa, he was ordained in 1940. In 1948 he co-founded with the Reverend Philip Mbatha, Iviyo loFakazi bakaKristu (The Legion of Christ's Witnesses): a charismatic movement within the Anglican Church.

Following a curacy at St Faith's Mission, Durban he was its priest in charge from 1952 to 1960 when he became a suffragan bishop of Diocese of St John's (called Assistant Bishop of St John's). Promotion to be the ninth bishop of Zululand then followed. From 1978 until his death in 1987, he was Speaker of the KwaZulu Legislative Assembly.

Anglican Church of Southern Africa titles
Preceded by Thomas Joseph Savage	Bishop of Zululand; 1966 –1975	Succeeded by Lawrence Bekisisa Zulu
