= Albert Lee (bishop) =

Albert William Lee was an Anglican bishop in the mid 20th century.

Lee was ordained in 1901. Following a curacy with the Eton Mission at Hackney Wick, he emigrated to Zululand where he became the Archdeacon of Vryheid in 1928 and then the Bishop of Zululand in 1935, holding the post until 1947.

== Notes and references ==
Anglican Church of Southern Africa titles
| Preceded by Charles Arthur William Aylen | Bishop of Zululand; 1935 –1947 | Succeeded by Eric Joseph Trapp |
