= Anthony Hunter (bishop) =

The Right Reverend Anthony Hunter
- Church: Anglican
- Province: Southern Africa
- Diocese: Swaziland

Personal details
- Born: 3 June 1916 Wanstead, east London
- Died: 8 June 2002 (aged 86)

Anthony George Weaver Hunter (1916–2002) was the inaugural Anglican bishop of Swaziland.

Hunter was born in Wanstead, east London on 3 June 1916. He studied at Leeds University and completed his preparation for Holy Orders at the College of the Resurrection at Mirfield, England. He was made deacon in 1941 and ordained as a priest in 1942.

Hunter began his ministry as a curate at St George's Church, Jesmond, in 1943 he went to South Africa and served in the Orlando Mission District until 1947. He then served at the Johannesburg Coloured Mission in Ferreirasdorp. In 1948 he returned to England and was appointed the vicar of Ashington. In 1960 he became the vicar of Huddersfield and after that the Rural Dean of Huddersfield. During his time at Huddersfield he was appointed an honorary canon of Wakefield

He served as the inaugural bishop of Swaziland from 1968 to 1975.

He returned to England once again and was rector of Hexham in the Diocese of Newcastle. In 1976 he became an Assistant Bishop in the Diocese of Newcastle; he resigned effective 1 September 1980. He retired in October 1981.

Anglican Church of Southern Africa titles
New title	Bishop of Swaziland; 1968-1975	Succeeded by Bernard Lazarus Nyoni Mkhabela
