= St Boniface Church, Germiston =

St Boniface Church
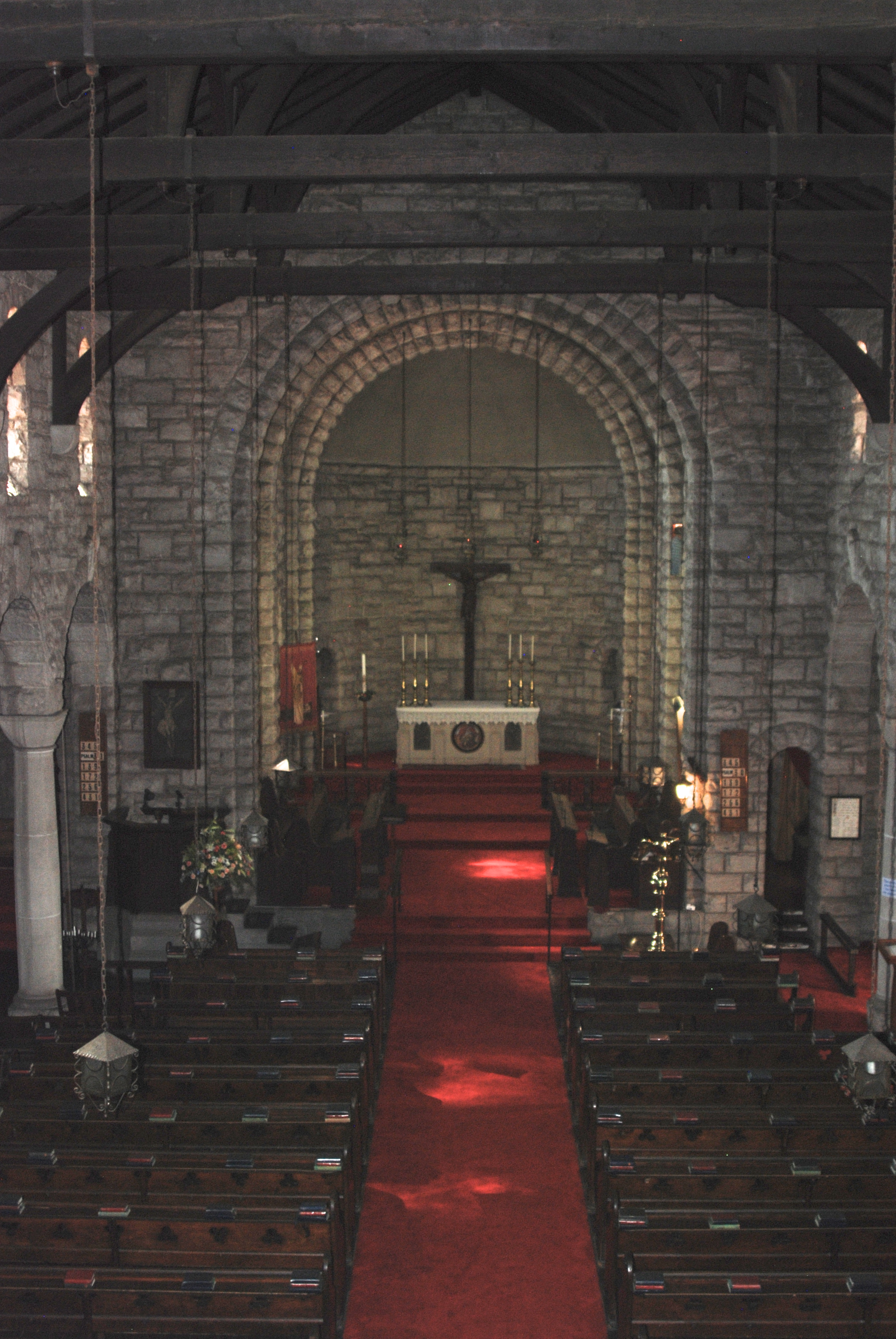

- Location within Greater Johannesburg
- 26°12′41″S 28°09′40″E
- Location: corner of Simmer and Meyer Streets, Germiston, Gauteng
- Country: South Africa
- Denomination: Anglican
- Website: www.anglicanparishofgermiston.org.za

History
- Dedication: St. Boniface

Architecture
- Architect: Herbert Baker
- Completed: 1910

Specifications
- Materials: stone

Administration
- Province: Southern Africa
- Diocese: Diocese of the Highveld

St Boniface Church is the mother church of the Anglican parish of Germiston, Gauteng which also includes the chapelries of St Mary and St John in Lambton, and St Mark in Rosedeep. The parish is part of the Diocese of the Highveld, which is in turn part of the Anglican Church of Southern Africa (previously known as The Church of the Province of Southern Africa).

== Foundation and establishment ==
The Anglican Parish of Germiston was formally founded in 1897. Prior to the parish being formally established, it was a mission chapelry of the parish of Boksburg, which had been established in 1890. Baptismal, confirmation and marriage records show that mission work existed prior to 1890, going back to the founding of Germiston in 1886. At that time the work of the mission priests fell under the jurisdiction of the diocese of Pretoria. Originally the parish consisted solely of the Parish Church of St Boniface in what is now the inner city of Germiston. The present church building is the second on the site, designed in 1908 and then built in 1910, both by Sir Herbert Baker. The original church was a tin building with a concrete and stone foundation, very similar in style to the miners' dwellings of the late 19th century and early 20th century period, as was found on the East Rand and the Witwatersrand in general.

The building of 1910 is typical of the Baker style so prevalent in South Africa and the British Empire at the turn of the 20th century. There are to be found many similarities with St George's Cathedral in Cape Town, built in 1901, the exterior of St Mary's Cathedral in Johannesburg, built in 1927, and the exterior of St George's Church in Parktown built in 1904. St Michael's Church in Boksburg, built in 1911, has Baker features too, but most of the design and the build were carried out by his architectural business partner, Frank Fleming.

The parish was originally part of the Diocese of Pretoria, but then became part of the Diocese of Johannesburg when it was founded in 1922. In 1990, when the need arose to split the large diocese of Johannesburg into smaller dioceses, to thus be better administered, the parish of Germiston became part of the Diocese of the Highveld.

== The building ==
St Boniface is one of the larger parish churches built by Baker, and indeed one of the few large church buildings designed by him to have been completed as to his original plans. It has seating capacity for about four hundred people, including the nave, side chapels and chancel. The church, which is of a stone structure throughout, has typical Norman or Romanesque features, as found in many of Baker's buildings, including some of the most beautiful stained glass windows of the early 20th century.

Apart from the gallery, nave, chancel and sanctuary, the church also has a small Lady Chapel with seating for sixteen congregants and an All Souls Chapel which is a war memorial to the dead of the First World War and was dedicated as the War Memorial Shrine in August 1918, even before the war had ended. Subsequently, after the various wars that were to follow, involving South African troops, and especially those who were parishioners, the shrine became the chapel seen today, as a memorial to all subsequent conflicts involving the armed forces.

There is also a crypt chapel underneath the chancel and sanctuary, which is alongside the columbarium which was specifically designed for the interment of ashes, and was consecrated for that use by the Rt Revd Timothy Bavin, the then Bishop of Johannesburg in 1977.

The historic two manual Norman and Beard pipe organ, built in 1910, is situated in an organ loft to the right of the chancel as one looks at the high altar. It was designed especially for the church by the company in England and shipped out for the opening of the Baker building. It is considered one of the best English Romantic organs in South Africa, albeit a humble instrument in relation to its cathedral counterparts.

Apart from the beautiful architecture and stained glass windows, the church houses some beautiful art works by the famous South African artist and sculptor, Cecil Skotnes. The icon of the Mother and child above the altar in the Lady Chapel is particularly noteworthy.

== Worship ==
The parish is well-known locally for its good liturgy, within the high church tradition and has maintained an active choral tradition since it was founded. At one time, in 1975, it boasted a choir of thirty-two boys and twelve men, not to mention twelve ladies. These days the choir continues to maintain this tradition and the high standards of the past. The parish is affiliated to the Royal School of Church Music, and the choir members regularly attend workshops and choir schools run by the local northern branch of the RSCM.

== Rectors and clergy ==
The parish's rector is Mtr Marlene Rodda; Fr John Rodda, her husband, who is also a professor of Paediatric Neurology at the University of the Witwatersrand and Baragwanath Hospital is a non-stipendary assistant priest. Before the Rodda's incumbency, Fr Don Thomson served as rector from 1997 to 2010. In December 2010, Fr Malcolm Chalmers, who had been Director of Music in the Parish since February 1997, was appointed as an additional self-supporting clergyman. He is also Headmaster of the Preparatory School of the historic St. Martin's School in Johannesburg.

Past well-known rectors of the parish have included Gonville ffrench-Beytagh, who later became Dean of Johannesburg and was subsequently deported by the apartheid government in 1972, Robin Roy Snyman who became Dean of Kimberley and later vice-provost of Port Elizabeth and David Beetge (bishop) who became the first bishop of The Highveld.

== Centenary ==
2010 saw the commemoration of the centenary of the Sir Herbert Baker building. Special events took place, most especially a thanksgiving service on Sunday 8 August, with choir, brass and organ, where the bishop, David Bannerman, delivered the homily. The celebrations concluded with a recital on the one-hundred-year-old organ and the usual Christmas music programmes.

== Parish 120th Celebrations ==
2017 marked the 120th anniversary of the founding of the Anglican Parish of Germiston, with St Boniface as the mother church of the parish. The parish includes the former chapelry, now church, of St Mary and St John and the chapelry of St Mark in Rosedeep. A special celebratory service was held on Saturday, 18 November 2017. The guest preacher was the diocesan bishop, Charles May. .

== Notes and references ==
- Keath, Michael (1992). Herbert Baker: architecture and idealism, 1892-1913 : the South African years. Ashanti. ISBN 978-1-874800-37-8.
