= Simon Aiken =

English rector

Simon Mark Aiken is Dean of Benoni and rector of St Dunstan's Cathedral in the Diocese of the Highveld. He was previously the 12th Dean of Kimberley and rector of St Cyprian's Cathedral, Kimberley, in the Diocese of Kimberley and Kuruman in South Africa. Born in England in 1962, he went to South Africa in 2006, initially as subdean at Bloemfontein Cathedral.

== Early career ==
Aiken qualified with a Master of Theology degree from St Andrew's University (1985) and a Certificate in Theology from Ripon College Cuddesdon, Oxford (1986-1988).

He was made a deacon (1988) and ordained as a priest (1989) in the Diocese of Blackburn.

Aiken served curacies, 1988-1994, at St Matthew with Holy Trinity, Burnley, and St Anne’s at St Annes-on-Sea. Subsequently he was vicar respectively at St Thomas the Apostle, Musbury, Helmshore (1994-1999), and at St Lawrence with St Paul, Longridge, north east of the city of Preston (1999-2006).

An early interest in liturgy led Aiken to researching and revising the compline rite for his theological college and to subsequent engagements in devising liturgies for many contexts and occasions at parish and diocesan levels.

Aiken became involved with the Royal School of Church Music both regionally and at a national level in the United Kingdom, being chaplain for the annual Easter course at Rossall School over a period of 11 years. He is himself a singer and he plays the organ and piano.

== South Africa ==
Aiken went to South Africa in 2006 to become the subdean at the Cathedral of St Andrew and St Michael in Bloemfontein in the Diocese of the Free State – a diocese having a link relationship with the Diocese of Blackburn.

In 2009 he was invited by Archbishop Thabo Makgoba to be champion for the Anglican Church of Southern Africa’s Liturgical Transformation Task Team.

As in England, Aiken was soon integrating musical endeavours with the theological and liturgical aspects of the life of the cathedral and he was instrumental in forming a new Free State branch of the Royal School of Church Music centred in Bloemfontein. He forged links between the cathedral and academic institutions in the city, formally as Anglican chaplain to the University of the Free State and the Central University of Technology, as well as through the fostering of musical connections.

Aiken enrolled for a PhD at the University of the Free State, to study African liturgical music.

== Kimberley Cathedral ==
In 2010 Aiken was invited to be Dean of Kimberley and was installed by Oswald Swartz, bishop of the Diocese of Kimberley and Kuruman at St Cyprian's Cathedral on 6 November 2010.

In his first sermon as dean, Aiken quoted Archbishop William Temple to remind his listeners that "the Church is the only cooperative society in the world that exists for the benefit of those who are not its members." He spoke of his vision to nurture a generous and welcoming spirit at the cathedral which serves not just its own parish but also the wider city of Kimberley and the diocese.

Aiken has described himself as being "a very embryonic student of Afrikaans" ("what can I say but 'ek probeer' - I try") while having a more fluent command of Sesotho.

His diocesan responsibilities included appointments as the Archdeacon of the Karoo (2011-2012) and as Titular Rector of St Mary's, Barkly West, as well as his role as Canon Missioner for the diocese and as Vicar General (April 2012).

== Benoni ==
Aiken was appointed Dean of Benoni in 2014 and was instituted and installed as Dean and Rector at St Dunstan's Cathedral on 25 May 2014. Following the retirement of Bishop David Bannerman at the end of January 2015, Aiken was licensed as Vicar General of the Diocese of the Highveld.

Anglican Church of Southern Africa titles
Preceded by Brian Victor Beck	Dean of Kimberley; 2010 –2014	Succeeded by Mphashane Reginald Leeuw
