= Justus Marcus =

South African Anglican bishop

Justus Mauritius Marcus (1955 – 1 December 2003) was a South African Anglican bishop. He was Regional Bishop of Saldanha Bay in the Diocese of Cape Town from 2002 to 2003, having served as Dean of Kimberley and Rector of St Cyprian's Cathedral from 1992 to 2002. He died from cancer, aged 48, on 1 December 2003. Marcus was predeceased by his first wife, Milly (who died in Kimberley in 2000). His second wife and widow is Sarah Rowland Jones, a fellow priest who then fulfilled a research ministry in the Anglican Church of Southern Africa at the behest of two successive Archbishops of Cape Town before returning to Wales in late 2013.

== Early years, Education and Holy Orders ==
Marcus was born in 1955 and grew up in Riversdale in the Western Cape, South Africa. Marcus Graduated from the University of Cape Town with a BA degree and gained his A.F.T.S. from St Peter’s Theological (Federal) Seminary. He was ordained as a deacon in 1978 and as a priest in 1979 at St Mark’s Cathedral, George.

== Positions held ==
Following his ordination, Fr Marcus served in the Diocese of George for five years. He was Curate and then Rector at Heidelberg.

He subsequently was appointed as a tutor, lecturing in theology at St Paul’s Theological College, Grahamstown. He furthered his studies at the University of London in 1986, where he lived with his family for three years.

The Marcus family returned to South Africa in 1990 when Fr Marcus served as a canon of St Mary's Cathedral, Johannesburg with an appointment as Rector of the Parish Church of St Luke in Bosmont in the Archdeaconry of Sophiatown.

== Kimberley ==
Canon Marcus was appointed as the 10th Dean of Kimberley and Rector of the Cathedral Church of St Cyprian the Martyr in the Diocese of Kimberley and Kuruman, where he was installed on 23 January 1992.

He was the first Coloured priest to hold the position of Dean of Kimberley. He served under Bishops Njongonkulu Ndungane, afterwards the Archbishop of Cape Town, and Itumeleng Baldwin Moseki.

Marcus supported the ordination of women and he helped prepare the first two women to be ordained deacon (and subsequently as priests) in the Diocese (by Bishop Ndungane) in 1995.

Projects initiated by Marcus in Kimberley included the establishment of a ‘Tamar House’ place of safety for abused women and Rape Crisis Centre and an Ecubread feeding scheme for the homeless. Liturgically, he introduced An Anglican Prayer Book 1989, sustaining the High Church flavour of worship at the cathedral. Adding to the fabric of the cathedral, stained glass by Estelle Valle was installed in the remaining clerestory windows in the sanctuary and nave, and the Stations of the Cross carved in wood by Bill Davis were introduced to the outer walls of the north and south aisles.

Marcus was renowned for his insightful weekly commentaries in the cathedral pew leaflet, sometimes also published in the local press.

Bishop Michael Nuttall recalls how Dean Justus Marcus insisted, tongue in cheek, on referring to “K & K” (the usual affectionate rendition of the Diocese of Kimberley and Kuruman) as “Kimberley and Kuruperson”.

== Elevation to the Episcopacy ==
Fr Marcus was elected Regional Bishop of Saldanha in the Diocese of Cape Town in 2002 and consecrated on 29 June 2002. He and his family took up residence at Bishopshaven in Malmesbury.

He was diagnosed with cancer soon after his consecration and died on 1 December 2003. He was buried from St. George's Cathedral, Cape Town on 8 Dec 2003. Bishop Tom Stanage presided at a Requiem Mass at St Cyprian's Cathedral, Kimberley, 10 December 2003.

A separate Diocese of Saldanha Bay was established on 10 December 2005.

== Ecumenical work ==
Bishop Marcus was a member of the Inter Anglican Standing Commission on Ecumenical Relations, through which he met his second wife, also a member.

Anglican Church of Southern Africa titles
Preceded by Robin Roy Snyman	Dean of Kimberley; 1992 –2002	Succeeded by Brian Victor Beck
Preceded by	Regional Bishop of Saldanha in the Diocese of Cape Town; 2002 – 2003	Succeeded by
