= Brian Beck =

South African Anglican priest

Brian Victor Beck, was an Anglican priest in South Africa, who served as Dean of Kimberley from 2003 to 2010. He was an Honorary Canon of St Cyprian's Cathedral. Canon Beck died in Cape Town on 1 February 2025.

== Education and appointments ==
Beck was licensed, prior to ordination, as a Sub-deacon at St Michael and All Angels, an Anglo-Catholic parish in Observatory, Cape Town.

He subsequently received formal theological training at St Peter's, Pietermaritzburg and St Bede's, graduating with a Diploma in Theology.

Beck was ordained a Deacon in 1985 and Priest in 1986.

Beck served at the Church of the Annunciation, in Paarl, where he was instituted as Rector in 1989.

== Kimberley ==
Beck was invited to serve as the Dean of Kimberley in 2002. He was installed as Dean and Rector of the Cathedral Church of St Cyprian the Martyr in Kimberley on 8 February 2003.

During his Deanship a number of significant projects enhancing the fabric of the cathedral were carried out, including the construction of a ramp for access for the aged and disabled and a Garden of Remembrance. The latter was dedicated on the occasion of the centenary of the laying of the foundation stone of the Cathedral, 5 March 2007. Beck was serving at the time as Vicar General for the Diocese of Kimberley and Kuruman following the retirement of Bishop Itumeleng Moseki.

The centenary celebration, culminating on 13 May 2008, was marked by a series of services and events, including the hosting of Episcopal Synod and the Consecration and Enthronement of Bishop Oswald Swartz.

Having reviewed the earlier involvement of St Cyprian's in formal education, one of the outcomes of the centenary was the rebirth of the St Cyprian's Grammar School. Dean Beck, as one of the founders, chaired its Board of Governors and gave guidance to the school from its opening in 2009. Beck House at the school was named in his honour.

== Retirement ==
Beck's retirement was marked by a Diocesan service on 31 July 2010. He was made Honorary Canon of the Cathedral on 12 September 2010, during a service of Solemn Evensong and Benediction of the Blessed Sacrament.

Anglican Church of Southern Africa titles
| Preceded by Justus Marcus | Dean of Kimberley; 2002 –2010 | Succeeded by Simon Aiken |
