= Roy Snyman =

South African Anglican dean (1934–2020)

The Reverend Canon Robin Roy Snyman was a priest in the Anglican Church of Southern Africa, who served as Dean of Kimberley and rector of St Cyprian’s Cathedral, and afterwards was Vice-Provost at the Cathedral Church of St Mary the Virgin, Port Elizabeth. He was born at Waterval Boven, in what is now Mpumalanga in 1934. He died in Port Elizabeth on 15 September 2020.

== Early career ==
Snyman was educated at Pretoria Boys' High School, going on to obtain a Licentiate in Theology through the Church of the Province of Southern Africa.

His first posting, in 1957, was as an assistant curate at St Saviour's Anglican Church in East London, South Africa, going on to serve in a similar capacity at Grahamstown Cathedral in 1960. He then served at St Leonard's, Heston, in London from 1964.

Returning to South Africa, Snyman was instituted in 1966 as rector of the Good Shepherd Parish in East London. He was appointed as chaplain at Rhodes University, Grahamstown, in 1968.

== Germiston ==
Snyman was appointed to the post of rector and regional dean at St Boniface Church Germiston, in the then Transvaal Province, in 1971. He served as Mayor’s Chaplain there in 1976.

In February 1978 Snyman made controversial remarks concerning Bishop Tutu just prior to his taking up his position as General Secretary of the South African Council of Churches. It has been said that Snyman’s "description of the kind of person the Church needs" in fact described Bishop Tutu "through and through."

== Dean of Kimberley ==
In 1978 Snyman was invited to be Dean of Kimberley as successor to Thomas Stanage and was installed as Dean and Rector of the Cathedral on 9 June 1978. He was to serve St Cyprian’s Cathedral until the early 1990s. During this time he was appointed Vicar General (1979 and other occasions when the Bishop was out of the Diocese). He served under Bishops Graham Chadwick and George Alfred Swartz.

He was also Priest in Charge to the small parish of St Hubert's Hartswater, and served as a chaplain to the South African Defence Force, at a time when sizable groups of conscripted soldiers would attend services at the Cathedral weekly . One of them was moved to refuse to carry arms after a service at St Cyprian's in the later 1980s (as revealed in a sermon at the cathedral in August 2009).

Snyman was warden to the sisters of the Community of St Michael and All Angels in Bloemfontein (the Community had strong historical ties with Kimberley, through, inter alia, Sister Henrietta Stockdale), from 1986.

Snyman was Archdeacon of Kimberley from 1988.

== Port Elizabeth ==
Upon his retirement from his post as Dean of Kimberley in 1991, Snyman went to Port Elizabeth as Vice-Provost and Rector at the Collegiate Church of St Mary the Virgin. In 1996 he was appointed chaplain to the Prince Alfred's Guard Regiment, Port Elizabeth.

He retired end of January 2001.

== Third Order of the Society of St Francis ==
Fr Roy Snyman has for long been a member of the Third Order of the Society of St Francis and served as guardian to its Africa South Region from 1995. He is also an associate chaplain of the Venerable Order of St John.

== Golden Jubilee ==
On 7 December 2008 the golden jubilee of the ordained ministry of Fr Roy Snyman was celebrated in a service in the Cathedral in Port Elizabeth. A lone bagpiper piped the people into the service. The Port Elizabeth Oratorio Choir joined the Cathedral choir to ensure music befitting the occasion.

== Other Appointments and Honours ==
Snyman is an Honorary Life Member of the Pretoria Boys' High School Old Boys Association. He has been a member of Rotary from his days in Germiston, was president of a branch of the organization in Kimberley, and has been involved in the organization in Port Elizabeth. In 1999 he was made a Paul Harris Fellow.

Ecclesiastical honours include being made an honorary canon of Kimberley Cathedral (1992) of Bloemfontein Cathedral (1997) and of Port Elizabeth (2008).

== Author ==
Snyman is the author of various articles in church periodicals and magazines, and of a book Travelling along the Anglican Way. CPSA. 2004..

== On ordination of women ==
The Revd Fr Ruthell Johnson of St Paul’s, Parsons Hill, Port Elizabeth, has recalled: "I remember the provincial synod in Swaziland at which the final decision on the ordination of women was made. Fr Roy was part of the team representing the Diocese of Port Elizabeth. He was strongly against the ordination of women, yet as the synod progressed, God was at work within him. At the close of the debate Fr Roy stood up and made an impressive plea to the synod to allow women to enter the priesthood. His speech influenced the synod and when the vote was taken there was an overwhelming majority for the ordination of women."

== Arms ==
Snyman had arms registered by the Bureau of Heraldry on 10 January 1979.

Anglican Church of Southern Africa titles
Preceded by Thomas Stanage	Dean of Kimberley; 1978 – 1991	Succeeded by Justus Marcus
