= Reginald Leeuw =

Dean of Kimberley

Mphashane Reginald Leeuw is the 13th Dean of Kimberley and Rector of St Cyprian's Cathedral, Kimberley, in the Diocese of Kimberley and Kuruman in South Africa. Leeuw was born in Barkly West, Northern Cape, and served in several parishes in the diocese prior to his appointment as Dean.

== Early career ==
Leeuw trained for the priesthood at the College of the Transfiguration in Grahamstown prior to his ordination as deacon and then priest in the Diocese of Kimberley and Kuruman. He served his curacy at the parish of St Mary the Virgin in Barkly West.

Thereafter Leeuw served for four years at All Saints in Upington, before going to Kimberley as parish priest at St Matthew’s in Barkly Road. He was subsequently appointed, and spent five years as, Rector of the Parish of St James in Galeshewe (Kimberley).

In 2012 Leeuw was appointed as the Archdeacon of the Karoo.

Leeuw qualified with an Honours Degree in Theology from the University of South Africa (UNISA) and was awarded a Master of Theology degree by the University of the Free State in 2016.

== Kimberley Cathedral ==
In 2014 Leeuw was invited to be Dean of Kimberley, a post he officially occupied from January 2015, being instituted and installed by Bishop Oswald Swartz of the Diocese of Kimberley and Kuruman at St Cyprian's Cathedral on 7 February 2015.

He continued for a time in his role as Archdeacon of the Karoo (2012–July 2015), then of the Archeaconry of the Cathedral. Like his predecessors, the Dean serves as Honorary Chaplain to the Kimberley Regiment. He also served as Chairman of the Board of Governors of the St Cyprian's Grammar School until its closure in 2021.

In 2024 Dean Leeuw was appointed to the College of the Transfiguration in Makhanda, concluding his term as Dean of Kimberley in the services of High Mass, and Choral Evensong and Benediction, on 28 July 2024.

Anglican Church of Southern Africa titles
Preceded by Simon Mark Aiken	Dean of Kimberley; 2015-2024	Succeeded by Vacant
