= Donald Harker =

Donald Frederick Harker (born 1945) was the seventh Bishop of George.

He was born in 1945 and educated at St Peter's, Alice and ordained in 1969. He began his career with a curacy at All Saints Mossel Bay before becoming the incumbent at Beaufort West. He ascended to the episcopate in 1999 and resigned his see in 2010.

Anglican Church of Southern Africa titles
| Preceded by Derek Damant | Bishop of George; 1999–2010 | Succeeded by Brian Marajh |
