= 1873 Griqualand West parliamentary election =

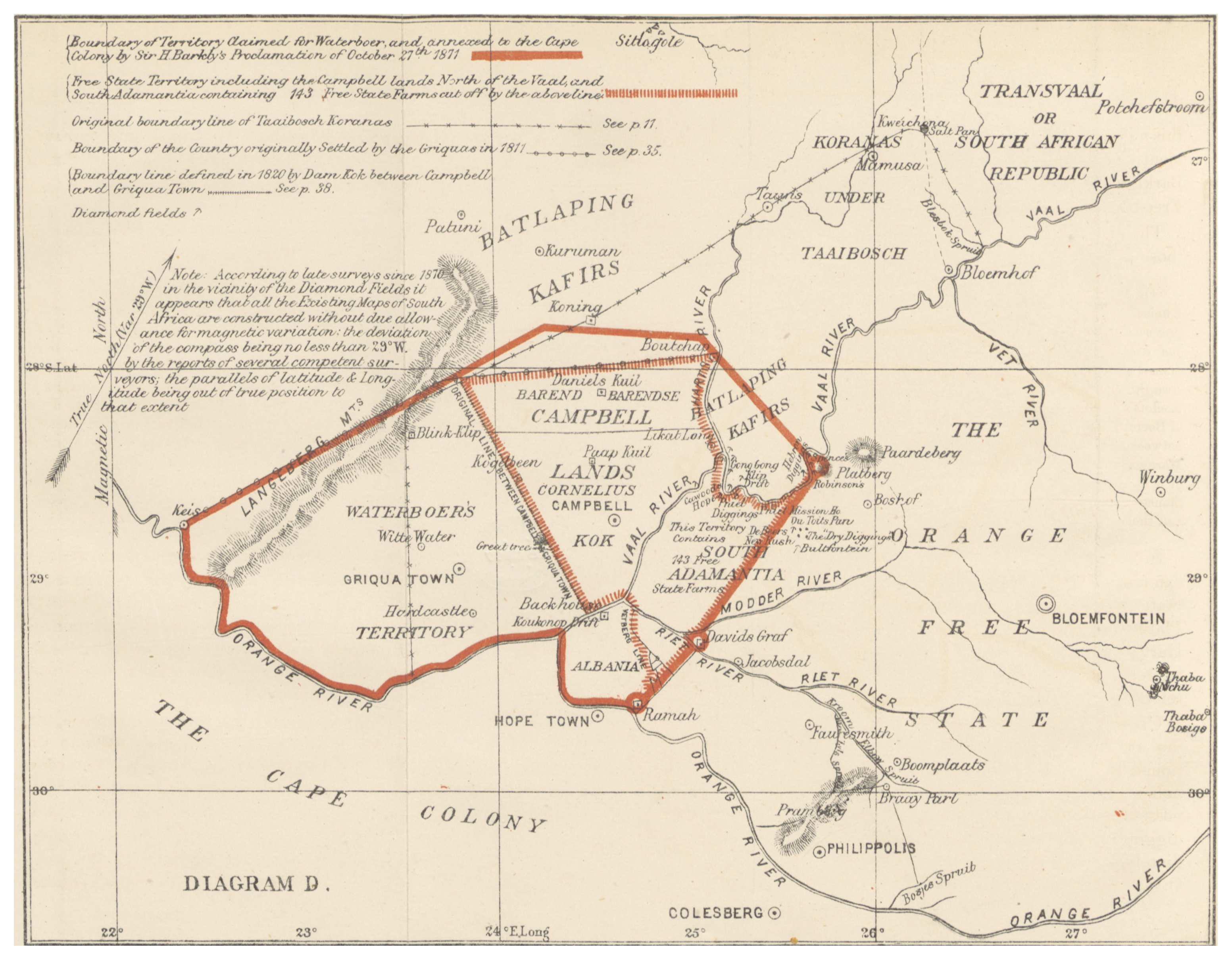
Map of Griqualand West in 1873.

The first election for the Legislative Council of Griqualand West was held in November 1873. Griqualand West had been established as a British Crown colony in January 1873. Of the 8 members of the Legislative Council 4 were elected.

== Constituency results ==
=== Kimberley ===
Kimberley 2 seats
| Party | Candidate | Votes | % | ±% |
|---|---|---|---|---|
| Independent | Dr Graham | | | |
| Independent | Henry Green | | | |
| Independent | Henry Tucker | | | |
| Majority | | | | |
| Turnout | | | | |
| Independent hold | | Swing | | |
| Independent hold | | Swing | | |

=== Barkly ===
Barkly 1 seat
| Party | Candidate | Votes | % | ±% |
|---|---|---|---|---|
| Independent | Francis Thompson | | | |
| Majority | | | | |
| Turnout | | | | |
| Independent hold | | Swing | | |

=== Hay ===
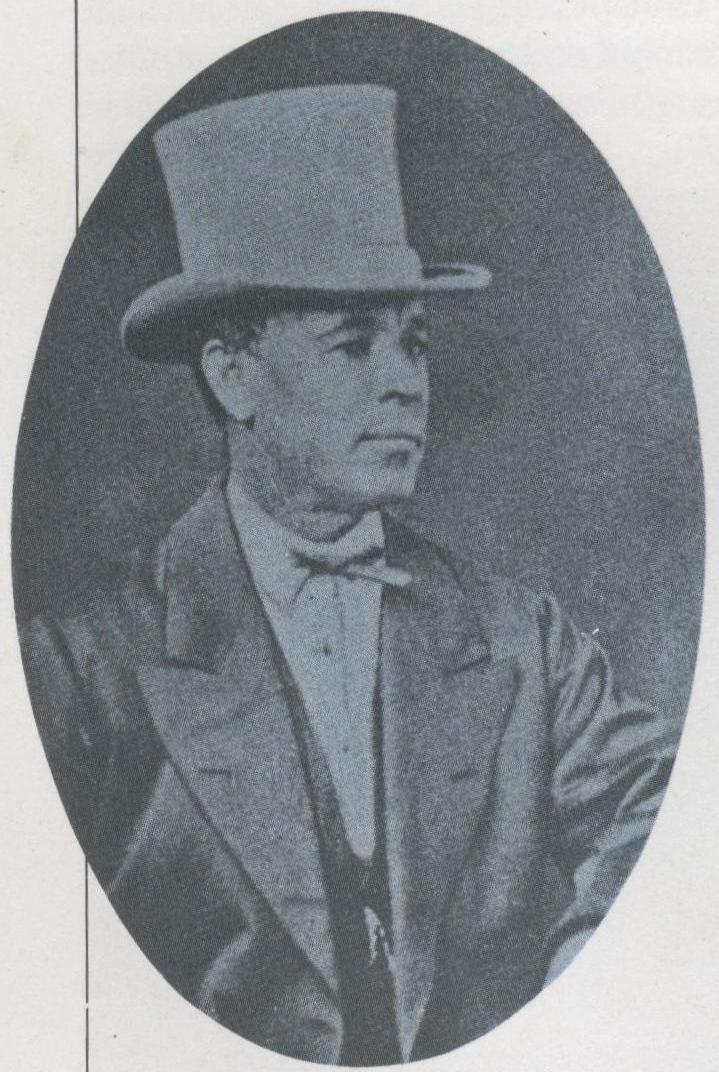
David Arnot, Griqua lawyer and diplomat

Hay 1 seat
| Party | Candidate | Votes | % | ±% |
|---|---|---|---|---|
| Independent | David Arnot | | | |
| Majority | | | | |
| Turnout | | | | |
| Independent hold | | Swing | | |
