= Walter Wade =

Walter Wade may refer to:

- Walter Wade (botanist), Irish physician and botanist
- Walter Wade (bishop), suffragan bishop of the Anglican Diocese of Cape Town, 1970–76
- Walter Ross Wade, American physician and planter
- Walter Wade, a character in the 2000 film Shaft

== See also ==
- Walter Wade Robinson, Anglican priest
