= Peter Beaumont (archaeologist) =

South African archaeologist (1935–2016)

- Born: November 1935
- Died: 31 August 2016 (aged 80); Kimberley, Northern Cape
- Education: Rondebosch Boys' High School
- Alma mater: University of Cape Town
- Scientific career
- Fields: Archaeologist
- Institutions: McGregor Museum; Bernard Price Institute for Palaeontological Research

Peter Bernhard Beaumont (November 1935 Cape Town – 31 August 2016 Kimberley) was a South African archaeologist noted for his excavation and finds at Wonderwerk Cave, Kathu, Canteen Kopje and Border Cave, all in South Africa. His work led to the conviction that, rather than trailing Europe and Asia, Southern Africa's Stone Age technology and culture had set the pace.

== Education and career ==
Beaumont matriculated at Rondebosch Boys' High School before studying archaeology at the University of Cape Town under Astley John Hilary Goodwin (1900–59), graduating with a B.Sc. in 1956 having taken geology as a major.

His first appointment was that of Research Officer (1958–64) at the Archaeological Research Unit at the University of the Witwatersrand and after that under Raymond Dart of the Bernard Price Institute for Palaeontological Research (1965–77). Finally he became Head of Archaeology (1978-2000) at the McGregor Museum in Kimberley, Northern Cape. His name is associated with, among others, Border Cave, Wonderwerk Cave, Kathu and Canteen Kopje, all highly significant sites in determining a new Southern African chronology of hominins. Border Cave was also the focus of Beaumont's dissertation which led to an M.Sc. with distinction in 1978.

In the 1960s Beaumont, while working under Dart, investigated the haematite mining activities at Bomvu Ridge in Swaziland. He determined that mining for the pigment specularite or specular hematite, pre-dated mining for ore, and extended back into the Middle Stone Age. Work by the field team uncovered an adit in the hematite excavated to gain access to a lode of specularite. The site of Lion Cavern within the Bomvu Ridge site yielded more than 30 000 artefacts in rubble older than 41 000 years.

Returning in 1971 from a season of fieldwork at Border Cave, Beaumont prepared to challenge the then prevailing view that modern humans had an Asian origin. In an article published by the Rand Daily Mail he stated his conviction that Africa would eventually prove to be the "source of modern man's beginning". Finds which he had made at Border Cave when subjected to radiocarbon dating by John Vogel would support his views. Beaumont and Vogel's articles appeared in African Studies and Nature in 1972. The articles included a comprehensive and formal tabulation of radiocarbon dates available at that time. Beaumont & Vogel's dates were corroborated by a team led by Paolo Villa and Francesco d'Errico. Their findings were published in the journal of PNAS in 2012 with Beaumont as co-author. Beaumont lived during a period when archaeology was turning into a multi-disciplinary science, and utilising the expertise of palynologists, sedimentologists and radiometric dating specialists became part of his own set of skills.

In 1978 he also relocated to Kimberley and the rich archaeology of the Northern Cape. His earlier interest in ancient mining at Bomvu Ridge had first brought him to the region where he examined ancient ochre mines near Postmasburg. Once settled at the McGregor Museum he started a number of excavation projects at Wonderwerk Cave, Kathu, the ancient hyaena maternity den at Equus Cave near Taung, and sites along the Vaal River which included Pniel, and Canteen Kopje near Barkly West.

Beaumont's views on the status and dating of the Stone Age in Southern Africa ran counter to the prevailing views, and, until incontrovertible evidence had been produced, led to a marked split in the ranks of archaeology. He was elected president of the South African Society for Quaternary Research in 1995, and vice-president of the International Union for Quaternary Research Congress hosted by South Africa in 1999.

== Personal life ==
Peter Beaumont was married to Mavis, the union producing two children, Bruce and Megan. Mavis, who predeceased her husband, shunned public appearances and was known only to family and close friends. He has two brothers.
