= Brian Marajh =

South African bishop

Brian Melvin Marajh (born 2 April 1960) is the thirteenth and current Bishop of Kimberley & Kuruman in South Africa. He was previously the eighth bishop of George, before, on 19 September 2021, the Electoral College of Bishops elected to translate the Right Revd Brian Marajh of George to become Bishop of Kimberley & Kuruman. He was consecrated as bishop at St Mark's Cathedral, George, on 7 May 2011. Marajh was born in Kimberley in the Northern Cape on 2 April 1960.

== Early life and education ==
Marajh attended the Homevale Secondary School in Kimberley, where he matriculated in 1980. Initial university studies were at the University of the Western Cape where Marajh graduated with a Bachelor of Arts degree.

He was ordained a deacon in the Anglican Diocese of Kimberley and Kuruman in December 1986, and priest in December the following year.

== Academic pursuits and clerical appointments ==
Marajh pursued post-graduate studies at Glasgow (Master of Theology) and the University of KwaZulu-Natal (PhD). He also holds a Certificate in Family and Marriage Counseling from UNISA.

Marajh was appointed Canon Theologian in the Anglican Diocese of Mauritius in 2004, serving as Rector of Curepipe, Mauritius, 2005–6. He was Director of the Diocesan Training Centre for Ministries.

He returned to the Church of the Province of Southern Africa, to the Diocese of George, in 2008, serving as Rector of All Saints, Mossel Bay.

== Vicar general and election to the episcopate: Bishop of George ==
In August 2010 Marajh was appointed as vicar general following the resignation of Donald Harker.

He was elected as Harker's successor at the elective assembly in George on 20 January 2011.

== Translation to the See of Kimberley and Kuruman ==
The Electoral College of Bishops elected to translate the Right Revd Brian Marajh of George to the vacant See of Kimberley and Kuruman, on 19 September 2021. He was enthroned as 13th Bishop of Kimberley & Kuruman in a service on 4 December 2021, presided over by the Archbishop of Cape Town, the Most Revd Thabo Makgoba

Anglican Church of Southern Africa titles
Preceded by Donald Harker	Bishop of George; 2011-	Incumbent

Anglican Church of Southern Africa titles
Preceded by Oswald Swartz	Bishop of Kimberley and Kuruman translated 19 Sep 2021-	Incumbent
