= Sidwell =

Sidwell may refer to:

- Saint Sidwell (Latin: Sativola), a British saint
- St Sidwells, a church and a city center area in Exeter
- Sidwell Friends School, a Quaker school in the United States
- Sidwell (surname)
- 7162 Sidwell, minor planet
