= William Manning (bishop) =

William James Manning was the fifth Anglican Bishop of George.

Manning was educated at Trinity College, Dublin and ordained in 1945. He began his ordained ministry as a curate at St Mary Donnybrook, Dublin, Cork Cathedral and St John's Pembroke on the island of Bermuda. From 1953 to 1964 he was a canon at Cathedral of the Most Holy Trinity after which he became a chaplain in Zurich. From 1967 to 1972 he was Precentor of St. George's Cathedral, Cape Town. He later became Dean of George at St. Mark's Cathedral in that city. He was ordained to the episcopate in 1978 and retired in 1984.

Anglican Church of Southern Africa titles
Preceded by Patrick Barron	Bishop of George; 1977–1984	Succeeded by Derek Damant
