= Patrick Barron =

Patrick Barron may refer to:

- Patrick Barron (writer) (born 1968), American writer, poet, and translator
- Patrick Barron (bishop) (1911–1991), fourth Bishop of George
