= Barkly West Museum =

Coordinates: 28°32′58″S 24°31′59″E

The Barkly West Museum was established in 2000 in the old Toll House beside the Barkly Bridge which crosses the Vaal River at Barkly West (Frances Baard District Municipality) in the Northern Cape, South Africa.

== Establishment ==
The museum was based on the collection mainly of minerals and archaeological finds gathered in the earlier twentieth century by Mining Commissioner Gideon Retief, which was once housed under imperfect conditions as the "Mining Commissioner's Museum" in the town. Following years of neglect, the toll house was restored and converted into a museum opened in Heritage Month, 2000.

== Displays ==
The displays comprise exhibition cabinets on local geology, archaeology and history and panels created by Kimberley's McGregor Museum, on precolonial history, the alluvial diamond diggings and the origins and social history of the town. The displays touch on mid-twentieth-century forced removals in Barkly West that were a consequence of the Group Areas Act under Apartheid.

A section of the display is about the Canteen Kopje skull, a cast of which is exhibited. A stone tablet bearing the names of noteworthy visitors to the nearby Canteen Kopje site and the Mining Commissioner's Museum in the 1940s includes the signature of the Abbé Henri Breuil.

Photographs showing the Barkly Bridge and Vaal River in flood overlook the river and bridge.

The museum has undergone a revamp in 2009–2010.

The 125th anniversary of the opening of the "Vaal River Bridge, West Barkly" - as it was originally named - was celebrated here on June 26, 2010, with readings from the Diamond Fields Advertiser, William Guybon Atherstone, Emil Holub, Sol Plaatje and Dan Jacobson.
