= Jonathan Lean =

Welsh priest (born 1952)

David Jonathan Rees Lean (born 29 May 1952) retired as Dean of St David's in the autumn of 2017.

Lean was born in Fishguard on 29 May 1952, educated at St David's University College, Lampeter, and the College of the Resurrection, Mirfield, and ordained in 1976. He began his ordained ministry as a curate at Tenby after which he was vicar of the grouped parishes of Llanrhian, Llanhowell and Llanrheithan and then St Martin's, Haverfordwest. From 2000 until his appointment as deanery he was a canon residentiary at St David's Cathedral.

He appeared on ITV Cymru Wales' 2014 documentary Wales on a Bus Pass with Chris Segar, meeting Segar on the bus in Solva, before alighting at Saint David's City Hall and making his way back to work at St David's Cathedral.

Church in Wales titles
Preceded by John Wyn Evans	Dean of St Davids; 2009 – 2017	Succeeded by Sarah Rowland Jones
