= St. Dunstan's College (South Africa) =

Location
- 54 Millburn Street, Rynfield; Benoni, Gauteng; South Africa; 26°08′47″S 28°19′24″E

Information
- School type: Private school
- Motto: I Serve
- Religious affiliation: Anglican
- Established: 1918; 108 years ago
- School district: Greater Benoni (D17)
- School number: 011 746 6500
- Rector: Mr Warwick Taylor
- Exam board: IEB
- Grades: Junior Preparatory (1–3) Senior Preparatory (4–7) College (8–12)
- Gender: Boys & Girls
- Language: English, Zulu & Afrikaans
- Schedule: 07:30 – JP:13:20 SP:14:00 College:14:15
- Campus: Urban Campus
- Campus type: Suburban
- Colours: Blue; White Gold
- Website: www.stdunstans.co.za

St. Dunstan's College is an Anglican private school in the Diocese of the Highveld in Benoni, Gauteng.
