= Herbert Gwyer =

The Rt Rev Herbert Linford Gwyer was the second Bishop of George, and a survivor of the sinking of RMS Lusitania.

He was educated at Uppingham and Magdalene College, Cambridge. After a period of study at Westcott House, Cambridge he was ordained in 1906 and he began his career with a curacy in Kirkburton after which he was a missionary in Qu'Appelle. A World War I Chaplain to the Forces, he was later Vicar of Christ Church, Staincliffe and St Johns, Wakefield before his elevation to the episcopate. He died on 18 November 1960.

Anglican Church of Southern Africa titles
Preceded by Henry Bindley Sidwell	Bishop of George; 1937– 1951	Succeeded by John Hunter
