= John Hunter (bishop) =

John Hunter (1897–1965) was the third bishop of Kimberley and Kuruman from 1943 until 1951. He was educated at Keble College, Oxford, and ordained in 1922. His first post was as a curate in Harrow but his next post was in South Africa (where he was to spend the rest of his career). After a further curacy at St Paul's church in Rondebosch he rose rapidly in the Church hierarchy becoming successively rector of Okiep, Northern Cape; Stellenbosch and finally the cathedral parish at Bloemfontein before his elevation to the episcopate. He was awarded the Coronation Medal and died at George, just after Christmas in 1965, while still in office.

== Family ==
A grandson, Martin Gainsborough is the Bishop of Kingston in the Diocese of Southwark. Another grandson, Andrew Hunter is the former Dean of Grahamstown.

Anglican Church of Southern Africa titles
Preceded by Theodore Sumner Gibson	Bishop of Kimberley and Kuruman; 1943 – 1951	Succeeded by John Boys
Preceded by Herbert Linford Gwyer	Bishop of George; 1951 – 1966	Succeeded by Patrick Harold Falkiner Barron
