= Canteen Kopje =

Archaeological site in South Africa

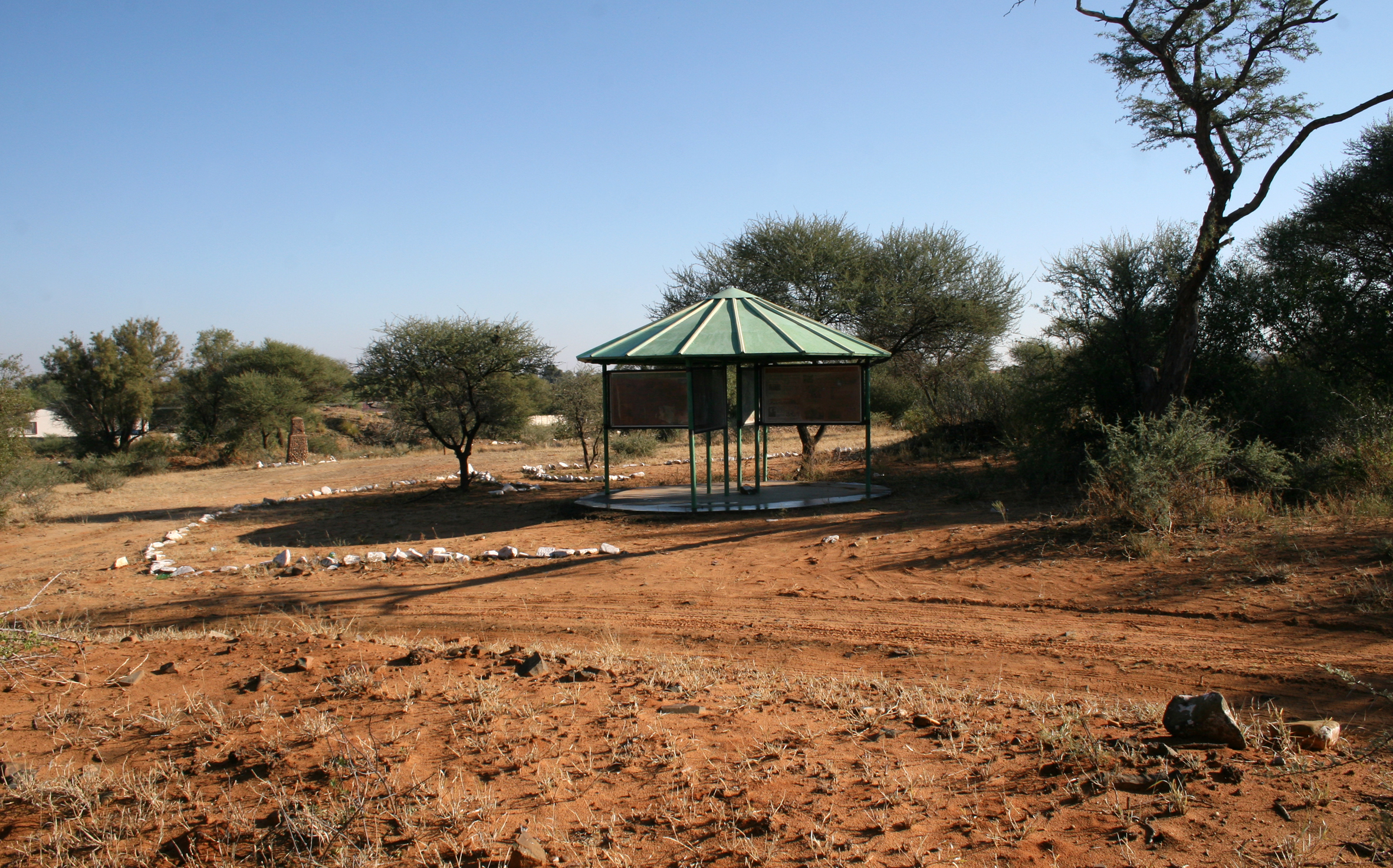
- Canteen Kopje site
- Interactive map of Canteen Kopje
- Location: Barkly West in the Northern Cape, South Africa
- Coordinates: 28°32′34″S 24°31′52″E

Canteen Kopje is an archaeological site, formally protected as a grade 2 provincial heritage site, and approved in 2017 for re-grading to national status, situated outside Barkly West in the Northern Cape, South Africa. The place was previously known as Klipdrift, meaning stony drift, a translation from a still earlier !Ora name, !a |aub. Canteen Kopje is best known for its long and exceptionally rich Earlier Stone Age sequence, spanning circa >0.5 to 1.7 million years, occurring within gravels exposed in late nineteenth and early twentieth century mining pits. Also attracting attention are more recent archaeological levels in the overlying Hutton Sands, which contain material known as Fauresmith, Middle Stone Age, Later Stone Age, and late Iron Age with evidence of protocolonial and colonial contact and interaction, probably, with nineteenth century diamond diggers.

The importance of Canteen Kopje as a heritage site was recognized, and a 9 hectares (22 acres) area known as Erf 91 was proclaimed as a protected reserve in 1948. Gideon Retief, Mining Commissioner of Barkly West from 1942 to 1951, was instrumental in preserving the site and creating the first open air exhibit here. Subsequently, in 2000, information panels were erected by the McGregor Museum. These were refurbished in 2016. A walking trail was laid out for visitors to view the early diamond diggings and archaeological research sites. The Barkly West Museum contains further information and examples of artefacts from the site, while material excavated by archaeologists is housed principally by the McGregor Museum, the approved archaeological repository for the Northern Cape Province in nearby Kimberley.

In 2016 the protected heritage site was directly threatened after the Department of Minerals and Energy issued a permit for part of the site to be mined. Although a heritage permit had not been issued by the South African Heritage Resources Agency, mining commenced on 18 March 2016. An urgent interdicted was granted by the Northern Cape Division of the High Court of South Africa on 19 March, being made final on 19 April 2016.

In the 1940s the archaeologist Clarence Van Riet Lowe predicted: "When the last diamond claim has been abandoned, archaeologists throughout the world will be interested in Canteen Kopje, in the Vaal River diggings, where lie the prehistoric remains of a million years of human evolution".

== Alluvial diamond diggings ==
One of the hills in the vicinity of Canteen Kopje was the site of the first alluvial diamond diggings (as opposed to surface prospecting) on the Diamond Fields of South Africa, which precipitated the rush to these parts in 1870. Digging continued here until the early 1940s.

Batlhaping Kgosi (Chief) Jantjie Mothibi controlled, for as long as he could, the influx of white "diamond seekers" to the region. Prospectors were allowed to use sharp sticks, but were not permitted to "touch the ground with pick and shovel". For their part, as noted by Jerome Babe in his 1872 book, The South African Diamond Fields, "Natives would form themselves in long lines, joined hand in hand, and walk slowly over the ground and look for diamonds, especially after rain; and if they found one they would take it to a trader...[Finds were exchanged for] horses, wagons, cows, sheep, cash, goods, etc at a deuce of a pace".

In January 1870 diggers from KwaZulu-Natal were working their way along the Vaal River, finding diamonds at Klipdrift, on the "Old Koppie", upslope from Canteen Kopje. Using "pick and shovel, in spite of the natives", they unearthed more, precipitating the diamond rush. Soon both banks of the Vaal River were thronging with diggers of many nationalities, and by the end of the year there were five thousand people at Klipdrift alone.

The diggers formed a Mutual Protection Association and elected Stafford Parker as their leader. Klipdrift was renamed Parkerton (from 1873 it was called Barkly West), and a Diggers' Republic was proclaimed in July 1870.

A popular early cradle sieve for recovery of diamonds was the so-called "Long Tom", which was reliant on large quantities of water. An improved version less dependent on water was developed by the American digger, author of The South African Diamond Fields, Jerome Babe. His 'dry sifter', known as the "Yankee Baby", is still used in the twenty first century by some small-scale diggers. At the time, its inventor was said to be "the first Babe to rock his own cradle".

The centrifugal or rotary washing machine – now standard on diggings in the area – is more sophisticated. In a slurry, a concentrate of heavy diamond-bearing deposit is separated from lighter waste.

Diggers staked their claims near the river, and dug the gravel where it was exposed at or near the surface. Where the gravel was buried deeper under silt and sand – such as at Canteen Kopje – large pits were dug. From these and from vertical shafts, the diggers tunnelled out precarious passageways in which a man could hardly stand.

== Geology ==
The sequence of geological deposits in the vicinity of Canteen Kopje comprises:

- Resistant 2 800 million year old andesitic lavas of the Ventersdorp Supergroup, underlying the entire area.
- Thin patches of circa 280 million year old basal Karoo Sequence sediments made up of tillite and shale locally.
- Shallow remnants of 19-17 million year old Older Gravels on the tops and upper slopes of adjacent hills.
- Up to circa 10 metres (33 ft) thickness of >0.5 to 1.7 million year old Younger Gravels formed largely from rock debris washed from adjacent hillsides.
- Up to 4 metres (13 ft) thick reddish windblown Hutton Sands that accumulated during drier intervals since about 0.3-0.5 million years ago.

Diamonds at or near Canteen Kopje are confined to the Older and Younger Gravels. Around 90-120 million years ago, a swarm of volcanic pipes, centred on Kimberley to the east, brought diamond-bearing kimberlite to a higher surface formed of Karoo Sequence sediments. Subsequent erosion has lowered the entire regional landscape by over 1,200 metres (3,900 ft) and in the process the diamonds were released from their host rock. It has been estimated that at least 50 million carats of diamonds were set free in this way from the five kimberlite pipes in the vicinity of Kimberley alone. Most of those were flushed away to the sea long ago in past and present river channels, but along the way some were trapped in alluvial deposits such as the Older and Younger Gravels along rivers in this region.

== Recognition of archaeological significance ==
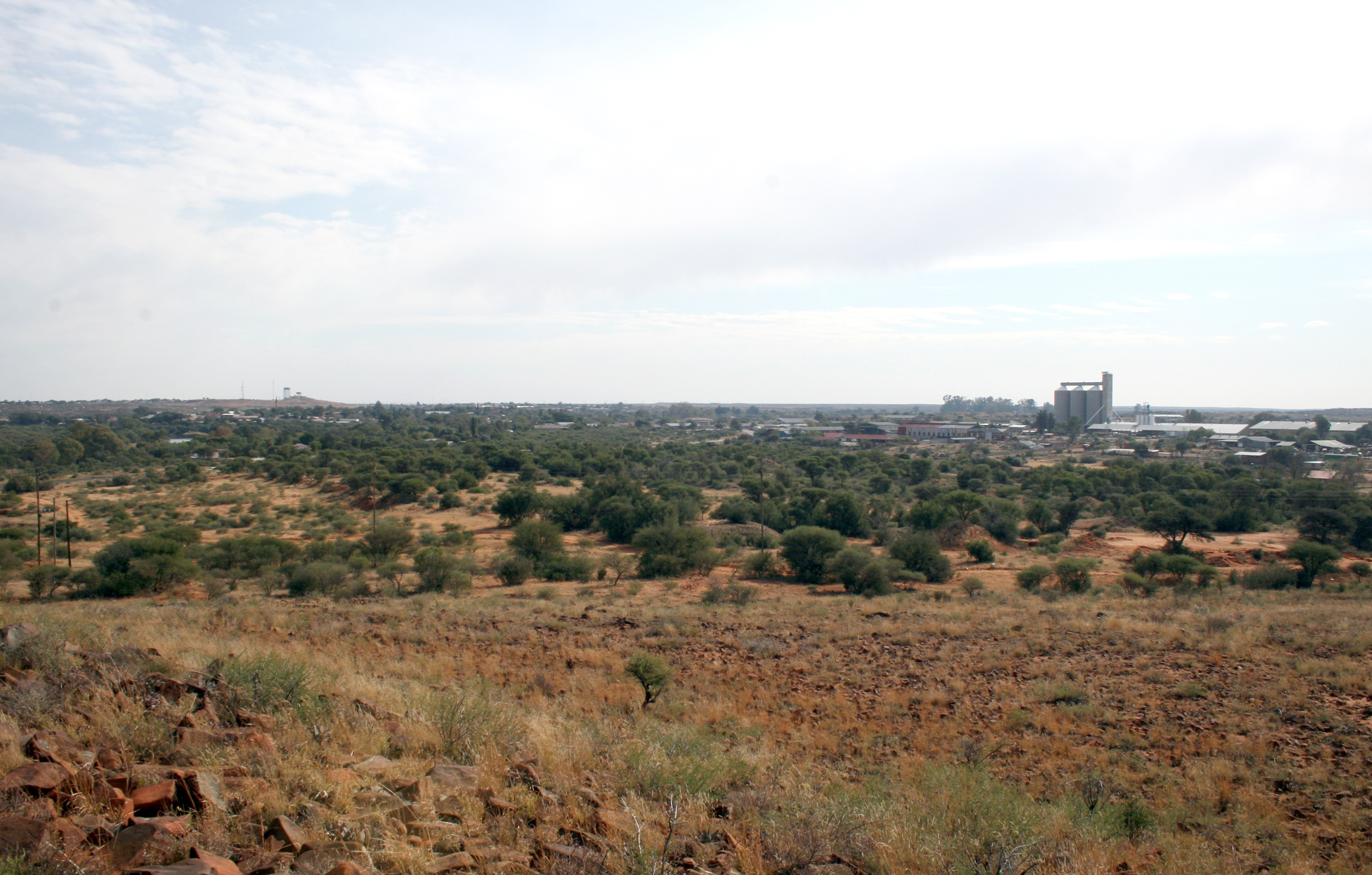
general view of Canteen Kopje site from the nearby hill

Earlier Stone Age artefacts were noted in the area by Colonel James Henry Bowker and Mary Elizabeth Barber at the time of the earliest diamond diggings. Eminent prehistorians including C. van Riet Lowe, the French prehistorian, the Abbé Henri Breuil and J. Desmond Clark visited and described it. Breuil was here in 1929 and again in the 1940s, when he famously noted that "not only are there enough specimens [there] to fill a museum to overflowing but to build it of them also."

== Preserved and almost lost ==
On account both of the mining history as well as the finding of Acheulean artefacts at this spot, a 10 morgen portion of Canteen Kopje was declared a National Monument (since 2000 known as a provincial heritage site) in 1948. Mining recommenced in the vicinity in the 1990s and Canteen Kopje was nearly lost. Pressure was exerted for the site to be de-proclaimed as a heritage site, to allow for renewed diamond digging and 'empowerment' of small scale miners. The local community recognised the value of conserving heritage and supported the efforts of the then National Monuments Council and the McGregor Museum to preserve the site, which was then developed as an open-air museum. The new Barkly West Museum was created at the same time.

Renewed threat was experienced in 2016. In 2014 the Department of Minerals (DMR) issued a permit for mining to take place on part of the declared site. The South African Heritage Resources Agency (SAHRA) was alerted and in response, because of the existing formal declaration, a Cease Works Order was put in place to prevent mining from taking place. Pressure was exerted however and in March 2016 the Cease Works Order was lifted, following which, on 16 March 2016, a diamond mining operation commenced work by fencing off an area around that for which they have a DMR mining permit. Public access to the remainder of the heritage site was blocked. Section 27(18) of the National Heritage Resources Act (NHRA) (Act 25 of 1999) states that: "No person may destroy, damage, deface, excavate, alter, remove from its original position, subdivide or change the planning status of any heritage site without a permit issued by the heritage resources authority responsible for the protection of such site." Section 51. (1) of the NHRA states that: "Notwithstanding the provisions of any other law, any person who contravenes— (a) sections 27(18), 29(10), 32(13) or 32(19) is guilty of an offence and liable to a fine or imprisonment or both such fine and imprisonment as set out in item 1 of the Schedule." Since the mining concern has commenced mining operations without such a permit issued by SAHRA, it is clearly in contravention of an Act of the Republic of South Africa and therefore is guilty of an offence.

== Archaeological and geological investigations from the 1990s ==
Excavations in the late 1990s were carried out by Peter Beaumont of the McGregor Museum. John McNabb from the University of Southampton worked with Beaumont in analysing the Acheulean stone artefact technology. Further excavations have been carried out by archaeologists from the University of the Witwatersrand (inter alia for application of cosmogenic nuclide burial dating) and the University of Toronto. The current active programme of research has yielded an as yet unpublished basal date of some 2.3 million years, while excavations involving students from the Sol Plaatje University in Kimberley investigate the most recent circa 19th century contact period archaeology showing interaction between local communities and colonial diggers.

Crucial to the interpretation of the archaeology of the site, is an understanding of site formation in relation to the adjacent hill and the Vaal River which at different periods cut down first to the north of the site and then the south west.

In 2007-9 a 7-metre sequence through Hutton Sands and Gravels was excavated to carry out dating and a detailed analysis of the lithic profile. There is a marked 'Victoria West' Acheulean horizon (named for the town in the Karoo where these stone tools were first described) in the upper part of the gravels, subject to a current Southampton PhD project. The lower part of the sequence contains simpler, older Acheulean technology.

Later Stone Age material at and just below the surface has been studied in two excavations by archaeologists from the University of the Witwatersrand and Toronto.

== Canteen Kopje Skull ==
The Canteen Kopje Skull was found in the vicinity in 1925 by diamond digger Kenneth Kemp, working 2.4 m down at an unrecorded locality at Canteen Kopje. A number of fitting skull fragments were presented by Kemp to the magistrate J.G. van Alphen, who in turn donated them to the McGregor Museum. They were studied soon afterwards by Robert Broom, who described it in Nature in 1929.

In Broom's reconstruction, the skull appeared to have features similar to an allegedly archaic skeleton found at Boskop near Johannesburg. In 2011-12 X-ray Computerised Tomography scans of the skull, carried out at the South African Nuclear Energy Corporation near Pretoria, suggested it falls within the range of variation of Khoe-Sān populations of the Holocene (last 12 000 years), and is not 'archaic' as Broom had suggested. Reconsideration of the evidence also points to it having come from the Hutton Sands and not the Younger Gravels, as previously presumed.
