= Clarence van Riet Lowe =

South African civil engineer and archaeologist

- Born: 4 November 1894; Aliwal North, Cape Colony
- Died: 7 June 1956 (aged 61); Knysna, Cape Province
- Other name: Peter van Riet Lowe
- Education: South African College
- Spouse: Iris Ethelwynne van Riet Lowe (née Kelly)
- Awards: FRSSAf 1934
- Scientific career
- Fields: Civil engineer, Archaeologist
- Workplaces: Historical Monuments Commission

Clarence van Riet Lowe FRSSAf (4 November 1894 – 7 June 1956) was a South African civil engineer and archaeologist. He was appointed by Jan Smuts as the first director of the Bureau of Archaeology and was among the first group to investigate the archaeological site of Mapungubwe.

== Early life and career ==
Van Riet Lowe was born in Aliwal North, Cape Colony to James Martin Lowe and Maria Wilhelmina Lowe (née van Riet). He was the eldest of three children. He went to school in Zastron, at Grey College, Bloemfontein and the South African College in Cape Town, where he studied civil engineering. He served in the South African artillery during both World War I and World War II. During WWI he was stationed in East Africa, Egypt, Palestine, Italy and France. During WWII he returned as artillery battery commander and was promoted to the rank of Major.

His interest in archaeology was piqued when he collected hand axes in the Wadi el-'Arish between Egypt and Gaza in 1917. After the First World War he returned to Cape Town to complete his degree in civil engineering. He worked in Pretoria and Natal and in 1922 he transferred to Knysna where he replaced the Westford Bridge that had been washed away in a flood. It was here that his interest in archaeology was again sparked.

In 1923 he became assistant engineer in the Orange Free State which meant that he spent considerable time out assessing and supervising construction of 89 bridges. This also gave him time to locate, catalogue and collect artefacts from more than 300 prehistoric sites, mainly in the valleys of the Wilger, Vals, Rhenoster, Caledon, Modder and Riet rivers and around the towns of Smithfield, Fauresmith and Wilton. From 1926 he corresponded with the School of African studies at the University of Cape Town and the South African Museum regarding his finds and donated his artefacts to museums in Bloemfontein, Cape Town and the University of the Witwatersrand in Johannesburg. After 1928 he travelled to many areas in the Transvaal and Cape Province. During this time he wrote and illustrated a paper on Smithfield culture and co-authored "Stone Age Cultures of South Africa" with A.J. Goodwin for the "Annals of the South African Museum".

In 1931 he became President of section E of the South African Association for the Advancement of Science and represented them at the British Association for the Advancement of Science (BSA) Centenary Meeting in London. He also represented South Africa on the International Historical Monuments Commission at the League of Nations in Geneva.

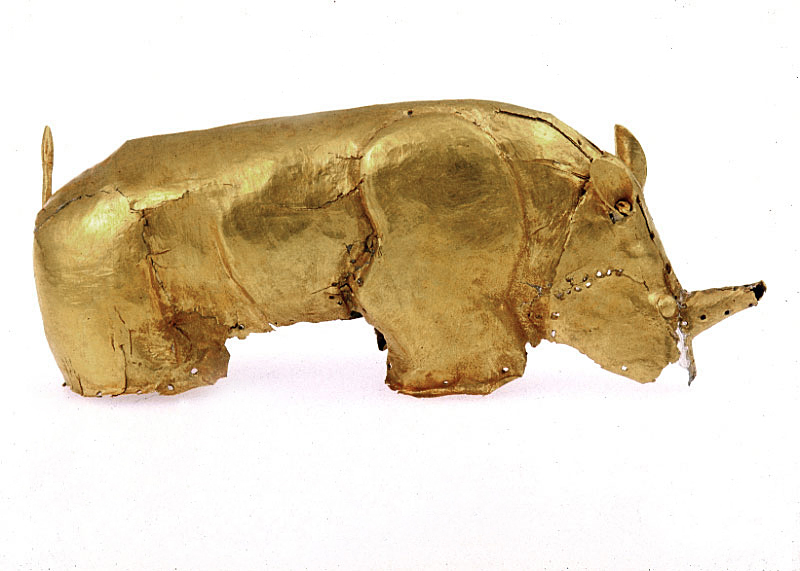
Golden Rhinoceros of Mapungubwe

He was involved in the investigations of Mapungubwe in conjunction with Professors Fouché, Malan and Tromp of the University of Pretoria in 1933 and wrote about it in 1936.

The president of the BSA, Jan Smuts initiated the creation of the Bureau of Archaeology in 1935 with van Riet Lowe as its first director. In the same year the University of the Witwatersrand awarded him the title "Professor of Archaeology", but the title did not include any teaching responsibilities. He spent his time creating a basic geological and climatological background for investigation of early man in South Africa using data obtained from the deposits of the Vaal River in conjunction with South African Geological Surveys.

In 1937 van Riet Lowe was elected President of the South African Museums' Association. He undertook research in, amongst other places, Egypt and Southern Rhodesia. In 1938 he received his D.Sc. (Archaeology) from the University of Cape Town. In the same year he collaborated with Robert Broom, the co-discoverer of Mrs. Ples.

In 1939 he collaborated with E.J. Wayland to produce "The Pleistocene Geology and Prehistory of Uganda, Part II" (published in 1952).

During the Second World War the government of Mozambique invited him to Lourenco Marques in the company of Abbé Breuil in 1941 and 1944. He attended the Pan-African Congress on Prehistory in Nairobi, Kenya (1947) and Livingstone, Zambia (1955).

In 1954 he retired from the Bureau of Archaeology (then called the "Archaeological Survey") and lectured for a single term at the University of Cape Town.

== Awards, recognition and membership ==
Van Riet Lowe received numerous accolades including:

- 1934 Fellow of the Royal Society of South Africa.
- 1935 Member (and later secretary) of the Commission for the Preservation of Natural Historic Monuments
- 1935 King George V Silver Jubilee Medal
- 1942 Member of the "Sentrale Volksmonumente-komitee" (in English: "Central People's Monument Committee")
- 1942 Medal of Voortrekker Monument Committee
- 1943 South African Medal of the South African Association for the Advancement of Science
- 1954 Queen Elizabeth II Coronation Medal
- 1956 Medal of the Historical Monuments Commission

== Selected publications ==
- Van Riet Lowe, C. and Malan, B.D. (editors). 1949. Die gedenkwaardighede van Suid-Afrika. Pretoria: Staatsdrukkery.
- The Stone Age Cultures of South Africa. Trustees of the South African Museum. 1929.
- Van Riet Lowe, C. 1929. Further notes on the archaeology of Sheppard Island, South African Journal of Science 26.
- Van Riet Lowe, C. 1937. Prehistoric rock engravings in the Vaal River basin, Transactions of the Royal Society of South Africa 24.
- Van Riet Lowe, C. 1944. Notes on Dr. Francis Cabu's collection of stone implements from the Belgian Congo, Transactions of the Royal Society of South Africa 30.
- Van Riet Lowe, C. 1952. The Pleistocene Geology and Prehistory of Uganda, Geological Survey of Uganda Memoir no. 6. Colchester
- Van Riet Lowe, C. 1952. The Distribution of Prehistoric Rock Engravings and Paintings in South Africa, Archaeological Survey Series 7. Cape Town.
- "The development of the hand-axe culture in South Africa". Proceedings of the Pan-African Congress on Prehistory, Nairobi 1947. Oxford: Basil Blackwell. 1952.
- "The Kafuan Culture in South Africa". The South African Archaeological Bulletin. 8 (30): 27–31. 1953. doi:10.2307/3887461. ISSN 0038-1969. JSTOR 3887461.
- The rock engravings of Driekops Eiland. 1955.
- Goodwin, A.J.; van Riet Lowe, C. (1929). The Trustees of the South African Museum (ed.). "The Stone Age Cultures of South Africa". Annals of the South African Museum. XXVII: 289. doi:10.1017/S0003598X00008395.

== Personal life ==
Van Riet Lowe married Iris Ethelwynne Kelly in Cape Town in 1922. They had a son and a daughter.

He was an accomplished illustrator and copied by hand a large number of the cave paintings and petroglyphs that he discovered. He also collected beads made by the indigenous inhabitants as part of his private collection.

He died on 17 June 1956 in Knysna following a minor operation.

== See also ==
- Kingdom of Mapungubwe
- Henri Breuil
- Makapansgat
- Canteen Kopje
- Driekops Eiland
- Revil Mason
