= Sarah Rowland Jones =

British Anglican priest

The Very Reverend Dr Sarah Rowland Jones
- Dean of St Davids
- Church: Church in Wales
- Diocese: St Davids
- In office: May 2018 – July 2026
- Predecessor: Jonathan Lean
- Successor: Paul Mackness

Orders
- Ordination: 1999 (deacon); 2000 (priest)

Personal details
- Born: Sarah Caroline Rowland Jones; 8 September 1959 (age 67)
- Denomination: Anglicanism
- Spouse: Justus Marcus (m. 2002; died 2003); Peter Evans (m. 2011)
- Education: Newnham College, Cambridge; St John's College, Nottingham; University of Nottingham

Sarah Caroline Rowland Jones (born 8 September 1959) is a British Anglican priest. She served as the Dean of St Davids from 2018 to 2026.

== Life and career ==
She was born on 8 September 1959 in Stoke-on-Trent, the daughter of David Rowland Jones and Pearl Jones (née Jenkins). She was educated at Welshpool High School and Shrewsbury High School, and studied Maths at Newnham College, Cambridge, graduating in 1980. She then joined the Diplomatic Service, with postings in Jordan and Hungary. She was made a Lieutenant of the Royal Victorian Order (LVO) for her role in arranging Queen Elizabeth II's state visit to Hungary in 1993. She left the diplomatic service in 1996 to train as a priest, and was made an Officer of the Order of the British Empire (OBE) in 1997.

She trained for the ministry at St John's College, Nottingham. She was then ordained as a deacon at Petertide 1999 (26 June) and then as a priest the following Petertide (24 June 2000), both times by Alwyn Rice Jones, Bishop of St Asaph and Archbishop of Wales, at St Asaph Cathedral.

In 2002, she moved to South Africa to marry Justus Marcus, a South African bishop. Following his death from cancer in 2003, she worked as a Research Adviser to successive Archbishops of Cape Town. In 2011, she completed a PhD in philosophy of religion and public theology at the University of Nottingham under the supervision of Karen Kilby, with a doctoral thesis titled "Doing God in Public: an Anglican interpretation of MacIntyre's tradition-based reasoning as a Christian praxis for a pluralist world". In the same year, she married Peter Evans, a Welsh man living in South Africa, and in 2013 they returned to Wales, where she became Priest in Charge of St John the Baptist Church, Cardiff.

After her appointment as Dean of St Davids was announced in November 2017, she was installed as Dean in May 2018. In June 2026 she announced that she would step down from this role, following a critical report revealing a financial crisis within the Cathedral.

In September 2026, she was licensed as a Priest for Hawarden, Broughton, and Sealand, in the Diocese of St Asaph.

Religious titles
Preceded by Jonathan Lean	Dean of St Davids; 2018–2026	Succeeded by Paul Mackness
