= St Dunstan's Cathedral, Benoni =

Anglican cathedral in South Africa

Coordinates: 26°11′17″S 28°19′15″E

St Dunstan's Cathedral, officially the Cathedral Church of Saint Dunstan is an Anglican cathedral in Benoni (Ekurhuleni), Gauteng, South Africa. It is the seat of the Diocese of the Highveld, encompassing the East Rand and southern Mpumalanga. The current dean is Simon Aiken.
