= David Bannerman (bishop) =

Bishop of the Highveld; South African Anglican bishop

The Right Reverend David Bannerman
- Bishop of the Highveld
- Church: Anglican Church of Southern Africa
- Diocese: Diocese of the Highveld
- In office: 2009–2015
- Predecessor: David Beetge
- Successor: Charles May

Orders
- Consecration: 25 April 2009

Personal details
- Denomination: Anglican

David Hugh Bannerman is a retired South African Anglican bishop.

== Education ==
Bannerman holds a Diploma in Theology (St Paul's College, Grahamstown), BA (Unisa), a BAHons Psy (Unisa) and Master's in Theology (Unisa).

== Clerical career ==
Bannerman started his church career in 1973 at St. John's Cathedral, Bulawayo and then moved to the Diocese of Bloemfontein in 1977. In 1995 he moved to the Diocese of South Eastern Transvaal where he became Rector of St. Dunstan's Cathedral and Dean in 1999. In succession to David Beetge, he was consecrated as bishop and installed as Bishop of the Highveld on 25 April 2009. Retiring, Bannerman's term of office ended on 31 January 2015.

He was granted Permission to Officiate in The Diocese of Canterbury, for a period of three years, with effect from 10 May 2021.

== Honours and awards ==
He was made an honorary canon of Bloemfontein Cathedral in 1994 and a Knight of the Most Venerable Order of St John of Jerusalem in 2007.

== Other work ==
Bannerman served as Chairperson of the Diocesan Counselling Board and Chairperson of the Diocesan Link Group (Diocese of Monmouth), a Director of the Highveld Anglican Board of Social Responsibility and a member of the St. Dunstan's College Council.

== Personal life ==
Bannerman is married to Joan and they had two children, Katherine and Eleanor – Eleanor died in 1992. Joan is a remedial therapist at St. Dunstan's College.

== Notes and references ==
- "Council Members". St Dunstan's College.
- Green, Ali (2011). A Priesthood of Both Sexes: Paying attention to difference. SPCK Publishing. ISBN 978-0-281-06694-0.
- Kgomo, J (19 August 2011). "Mbombo v Church of the Province of Southern Africa, Diocese of Highveld". South african Legal Information Institute.

Anglican Church of Southern Africa titles
Preceded by David Beetge	Bishop of the Highveld; 2009–2015	Succeeded by Charles May
