= Sidwell (surname) =

Sidwell is a surname. Notable people with the surname include:

- Aaron Sidwell (born 1988), English actor, singer, musician and producer
- Ezra Sidwell (1885–1949), English rugby league footballer
- Henry Sidwell (1857–1936), Anglican bishop
- Ken Sidwell (1936–2022), American college head basketball and baseball head coach
- Martindale Sidwell (1916–1998), English organist, composer and teacher
- Paul Sidwell, Australian linguist
- Steve Sidwell (born 1982), English footballer
- Steve Sidwell (American football) (1944–2023), American football coach
- Steve Sidwell (musician), British arranger, composer, and trumpeter
- Tom Sidwell (1888–1958), English cricketer
