= Henry Sidwell =

The Right Reverend Henry Sidwell
- Bishop of George
- Diocese: Diocese of George
- In office: 1911–1936
- Successor: Herbert Gwyer
- Other post: Archdeacon of Pretoria

Orders
- Ordination: 1889
- Consecration: c. 1911

Personal details
- Born: 1857
- Died: 31 August 1936 (aged 78–79) George, Cape Province, South Africa
- Denomination: Anglicanism

Henry Bindley Sidwell (1857 – 31 August 1936) was the first Bishop of George, the first South African-born bishop to head a diocese.

He was born in Grahamstown and educated at the University of the Cape of Good Hope. Ordained in 1889 he began his career with a curacy in Johannesburg after which he was rector of Middleburg and then Archdeacon of Pretoria before his appointment to the episcopate. He died in post on 31 August 1936.

== Publications ==
- The Story of South Africa: an Outline of South African History. JC Juta & Company. 1891.
- The Work of the Church Among the White Settlers of South Africa. Society for Promoting Christian Knowledge. 1908.

Anglican Church of Southern Africa titles
New diocese	Bishop of George; 1911–1936	Succeeded by Herbert Gwyer
