= David Beetge =

South African Anglican bishop (1948–2008)

David Beetge was Bishop of the Highveld, South Africa, and Dean of the Province of the Anglican Church of Southern Africa—the most senior bishop next to the Archbishop of Cape Town. Born at Witbank in October 1948, he died in Johannesburg on 27 September 2008.

== Early career ==
Beetge began a career in the commercial world, becoming, in his late 20s, company secretary of ICI (a computer consultancy) in South Africa. He had qualified through the Chartered Institute of Secretaries and Administrators. He commenced theological training at St Paul’s Theological College in Grahamstown, subsequently earning bachelor and honour degrees in theology at the University of South Africa. He obtained a master's degree in theology from the University of Natal.

== Ordained ministry ==
Beetge was ordained as a priest in 1981. He served in various churches before being made vicar general, and later bishop, of the new Diocese of South Eastern Transvaal in 1990, which from 1998 became known as the Diocese of the Highveld. Beetge served the worldwide Anglican Communion with distinction as co-chairman of the International Anglican-Roman Catholic Commission on Unity and Mission (IARCCUM). Archbishop Thabo Makgoba characterised him as "an outstanding and exemplary leader” of the church. In England he was remembered as an advocate of Christian unity and a champion of the poor and those living with HIV/AIDS. The then Archbishop of Canterbury, Rowan Williams, said following Beetge’s death that "The Anglican church worldwide [had] lost an exceptional man, warm, intelligent, utterly dedicated, imaginative and that many had 'lost a deeply valued friend'."

Anglican Church of Southern Africa titles
Preceded by Inaugural	Bishop of the Highveld; 1990-2008	Succeeded by David Bannerman
