= Graham Chadwick =

British Christian missionary

- Bishop of Kimberley and Kuruman
- Diocese: St Asaph's, Liverpool and Salisbury
- In office: 1976-1982
- Predecessor: Philip Wheeldon
- Successor: George Swartz

Personal details
- Born: 3 January 1923
- Died: 28 October 2007 (aged 84)
- Denomination: Christian
- Spouse: Suzanne Tyrell
- Occupation: Missionary
- Education: Bishop Gore School; School of Oriental and African Studies

Graham Charles Chadwick (3 January 1923 – 28 October 2007) was a British Christian missionary in Lesotho (1953–1963; 1970–1976) and South Africa (1976–1982). On his election as Anglican Bishop of Kimberley and Kuruman in 1976 he campaigned strongly against the racist apartheid policies of the South African government. As a result, he was expelled from South Africa in 1982 and returned to Britain. Afterwards he assisted in the dioceses of St Asaph's, Liverpool and Salisbury.

== Early life ==
Chadwick was born into the large family of a railway signalman. When he was only ten years old, his father died, and his mother took her children to Swansea. Chadwick was educated in Swansea at the Bishop Gore School.

When he left the school in 1939 at the age of sixteen, he was unsure of his vocation to ordination, and he spent the first three years of the Second World War maintaining station clocks on the railway line from Swansea to mid-Wales. In 1942 he joined the Royal Navy Volunteer Reserve, and once his linguistic talents were identified, he was appointed a midshipman. Japanese language training at the School of Oriental and African Studies in London was followed by a posting to Sri Lanka and by an assignment as an intelligence officer to the Pacific theatre, where he served on HMS Indefatigable and HMS Formidable and lost a close friend in a Japanese kamikaze attack. After V-J Day he was involved in the interrogation of Japanese war criminals being held in Australian POW camps. He left the navy with the rank of sub-lieutenant.

== Early ministry in Swansea and Lesotho ==
Even on leaving school he had felt a call to Holy Orders, and on demobilisation he decided to pursue this. On his first attempt to gain admission to Keble College, Oxford he was told that his academic qualifications were insufficient, so he proceeded to teach himself sufficient Latin, Greek and Hebrew to gain admission, and eventually graduated with a second-class honours degree in theology.

He completed his training at St Michael's College, Llandaff, and in 1950 was appointed to a curacy in Oystermouth in Swansea. Here he met Suzanne Tyrell – whom he would marry in 1955. He had begun to consider missionary work, and a chance meeting with John Maund, Bishop of Lesotho, led him to move to Lesotho in 1953. He taught himself Sesotho on the voyage to Cape Town, and for the next ten years ministered throughout Lesotho, covering up to 2000 miles a year on horseback. A major achievement of this period of ministry was the establishment of St Stephen's High School, Mohales Hoek, still regarded as one of the finest schools in southern Africa.

== Return to Britain ==
In 1963 Chadwick returned to Britain, taking up a position as chaplain at University College of Swansea (then part of the federal University of Wales) for five years. Here he strongly influenced many students, amongst them one Rowan Williams.

He then undertook a sabbatical year at Queen's College, Birmingham, where he studied clinical psychology. He also acted as the college's Senior Bursar during his year there, before undertaking a brief chaplaincy at St Thomas' Hospital, London.

== Second period in Africa and anti-apartheid activism ==
In 1970 Chadwick returned to Lesotho, where as Diocesan Missioner he was to build an ecumenical conference and training centre in Maseru, with the aim of building racial equality and reconciliation.

After six years running the centre, the leadership skills he had demonstrated there saw him selected in 1976 as the next Bishop of Kimberley and Kuruman in South Africa. He was enthroned in St Cyprian's Cathedral, Kimberley in a service complete with fanfares from Salvation Army trumpeters.

Chadwick was soon involved in a schools boycott. When many black African pupils refused to attend schools in protest against the compulsory teaching of Afrikaans, he and the rest of the diocesan clergy encouraged students to complete their education, but also began to speak out against Apartheid. The South African Police accused clergy of maintaining links with the South African Students' Organisation, and six clergy and diocesan youth workers were arrested. One of the youth workers, Phakamile Mabija, a member of the Anglican Nomads Educational Group, was arrested for allegedly vandalising public transport in Galeshewe. Chadwick was then out of the country so it was Thomas Stanage, Dean of Kimberley, who was first informed that Mabija had died after apparently falling from the seventh-floor of the police station. On his return Chadwick protested against the death (particularly after the inquest proved to be a whitewash) and against the continued detention of his clergy. He planted wooden crosses outside his cathedral for each day the detention continued, and encouraged the ringing of church bells in protest. Once the clergy were released, the Chadwicks were placed under police surveillance, responding by taking regular cups of tea out to the policemen watching their house.

Chadwick continued to work closely with other senior South African clergy, including Desmond Tutu (then secretary of the South African Council of Churches), and to speak out against injustice. As a result, in 1982 the authorities refused to renew his work permit. At the time he was visiting the homeland of Bophuthatswana so found himself stranded there. At first he attempted to continue running his diocese from the Anglican hospital there, but it soon became clear that this was not a viable long-term option. He managed to return to Kimberley in order to conduct the Easter services, and in one final show of defiance, preached in both the local languages of Sesotho and Setswana and (for the benefit of the police), Afrikaans. The following day, he and his family were escorted to the airport and deported, watched by a large contingent of armed police with dogs, and 50,000 (mainly black) protesters.

== Later ministry in Britain ==
On his enforced return to Britain, Chadwick began working as a chaplain at St Asaph's Cathedral and as diocesan adviser on spirituality. In 1985, with Father Gerard Hughes SJ and Sister Mary Rose Fitzsimmons he co-founded the Llysfasi Spirituality Workshop which developed an international influence. He was also heavily involved in the l'Arche communities.

In 1990 Chadwick was persuaded by David Sheppard, Bishop of Liverpool – himself well known for ecumenical work – to become an assistant bishop in the Diocese of Liverpool.

In 1995, at the age of 72, he moved for the last time, to Salisbury to take up the post of Director of Spirituality at the newly established Sarum College, finally retiring in 1998.

Even in retirement he continued to offer personal counselling until the early part of 2007. After suffering a variety of health problems, he died on 28 October 2007, five minutes after receiving the Eucharist.

Chadwick's Funeral Mass, celebrated by Rowan Williams, Archbishop of Canterbury, took place in Salisbury Cathedral on 5 November 2007. On 6 November there was a further Requiem Mass celebrated in the church at Oystermouth in Swansea, where Chadwick had served his curacy. This service was conducted by John Davies, Bishop of St Asaph; with Anthony Pierce, Bishop of Swansea and Brecon; and Saunders Davies, retired Bishop of Bangor, also in attendance. After this service, Chadwick was buried in Oystermouth Cemetery alongside his wife Suzanne, and her parents Kate and William Tyrell

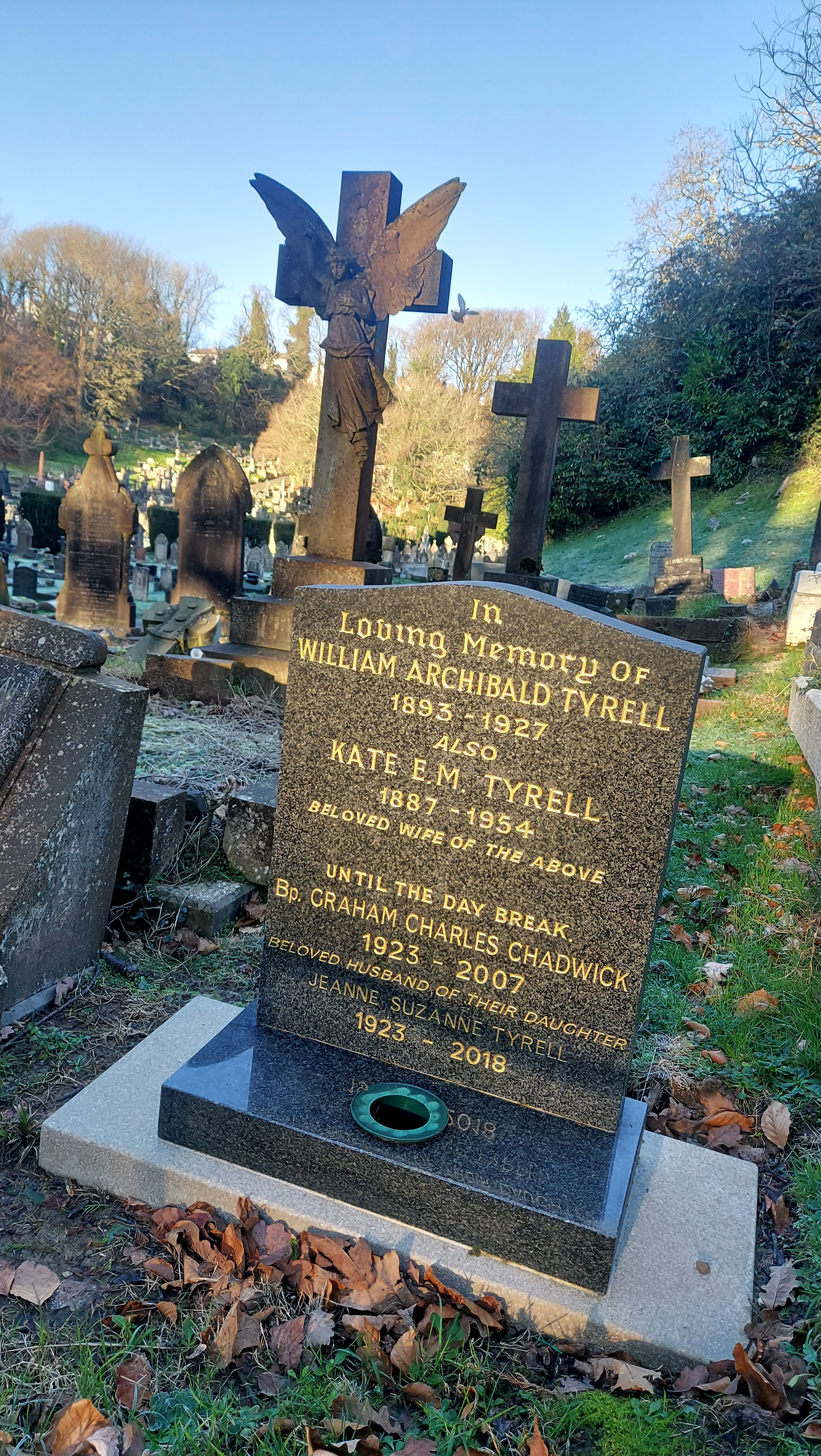
Grave of Graham Chadwick in Oystermouth Cemetery, Mumbles, Swansea

== Languages ==
Chadwick is said to have been fluent in 11 languages, but no source lists them all. They include English, Japanese, Sesotho, Setswana, Afrikaans, Hebrew, Latin and Greek.

== See also ==
- Trevor Huddleston

Anglican Church of Southern Africa titles
Preceded by Philip Wheeldon	Bishop of Kimberley and Kuruman; 1976–1982	Succeeded by George Swartz
