= George Swartz =

Anglican bishop

George Alfred Swartz (8 September 1928 - 1 January 2006) was a South African Anglican bishop. He was the ninth Bishop of Kimberley and Kuruman.

== Education ==
Swartz was educated at the University of the Witwatersrand and Pembroke College, Cambridge.

== Priesthood and elevation to Episcopate ==
Ordained in 1955, he began his career with a curacy in Cape Town and held a number of pastoral posts in the area before becoming a suffragan bishop of the diocese in 1972.

== Bishop of Kimberley and Kuruman ==
Eleven years later he was translated to Kimberley and Kuruman, in 1983, where he remained until retirement, in 1991.

== Link with the Diocese of Atlanta ==
Bishop Swartz originated a link between Kimberley and Kuruman and the Diocese of Atlanta in the United States of America, and on 5 June 1984 he was awarded Freedom of the City of Compton.

== Death ==
He died in retirement in Cape Town on New Year's Eve 2006.

== Notes ==
Anglican Communion titles
Preceded by Graham Charles Chadwick	Bishop of Kimberley and Kuruman; 1983 –1991	Succeeded by Winston Njongonkulu Ndungane
