= Walter Wade (bishop) =

South African bishop

Suffragan Bishop of Cape Town
- In office 1970-1976

Personal details
- Born: Sydney Walter Wade; 21 March 1909
- Died: 10 March 1976 (aged 66)
- Education: Kelham Theological College

Sydney Walter Wade (called Walter; 21 March 1909 – 10 March 1976) was Suffragan Bishop of Cape Town from 1970 to 1976.

Wade was educated at King Edward VI School, Lichfield and Kelham Theological College; and ordained in 1934. After a curacy in Nottingham he held incumbencies at Kimberley and Upington, in the Diocese of Kimberley and Kuruman. He was Archdeacon of Bechuanaland from 1954 to 1958; and of Kimberley from 1958 to 1963. He was Dean of Umtata from 1963 to 1967; and Archdeacon of Western Transvaal from 1967 until his appointment to the episcopate. In 1975 he was appointed a Chaplain of the Order of St John.
