= Patrick Barron (bishop) =

Patrick Harold Falkiner Barron, also called Paddy, (13 November 1911 – 27 August 1991) was the fourth Bishop of George.

Barron was educated at Leeds University and (after studies at the College of the Resurrection, Mirfield) ordained in 1939. He began his ordained ministry a curate at Our Most Holy Redeemer, Clerkenwell after which he was a chaplain to the South African Army during World War II. After the war he held incumbencies at Zeerust, Potchefstroom and Blyvooruitzicht. Later he was Archdeacon of Germiston, then Dean of Johannesburg. In 1964 he was ordained to the episcopate as Suffragan Bishop of Cape Town and two years later was translated to George.

Anglican Church of Southern Africa titles
Preceded by John Hunter	Bishop of George; 1966– 1977	Succeeded by William James Manning
