= St Mary's, Barkly West =

Coordinates: 28°32′10″S 24°31′16″E

The Parish Church of St Mary the Virgin, Barkly West, was for some years the principal Anglican parish on the Diamond Fields, South Africa, and the churches established soon afterwards at the Dry Diggings – what would become Kimberley – were at first mere outstations.

== Establishing the Anglican Church on the Diamond Fields ==
The first visit by an Anglican priest to the Diamond Fields, in 1870, came from the Free State when the Revd Charles Clulee, born in 1837 Birmingham, England, spent part of a winter holiday there from Bloemfontein. Revd. Clulee was head of the Grammar School in Bloemfontein, and ran the diocesan "Native Mission".

Ecclesiastical jurisdiction over the Diamond Fields – which, like the Diocese of Bloemfontein as a whole, lay beyond the Queen's dominions – was first officially extended with the arrival of Archdeacon Henry Kitton from Grahamstown in November 1870. He was temporarily appointed by the bishop of Grahamstown (acting as metropolitan bishop) "to the pastoral charge of the whole district on both sides of the river." Anglican services and rites were to be performed only by the archdeacon or clergymen he had authorized – until permanent arrangements were made.

Within a month, "Church of England Services" were being advertised and held at Pniel, "in the new church tent"; in the Music Hall at Klipdrift (afterwards called Barkly West); and also at Good Hope. Moving swiftly to consolidate an Anglican presence, Kitton convened a meeting of the English Church Committee in December 1870. R.W. Murray, accepting office as secretary, advocated the erection of a church building and in February 1871 the British High Commissioner Sir Henry Barkly, during his visit, laid the foundation stone.

It was also in February 1871 that the Revd Henry Sadler arrived via Bloemfontein, and was referred to as "Chaplain to the Fields", within the Diocese of Bloemfontein. Sadler had been recruited in England during Bishop Robert Gray's recent visit there. He saw to the completion of the church building.

St Mary the Virgin, Barkly West, was dedicated in November 1872, with Fr E. Stenson as first rector. It held its place as the first and principal parish at this western edge of the Diocese of Bloemfontein until gradually other parishes – such as those in Kimberley – could stand on their own (having initially been chapelries administered from Barkly). When eventually in 1911 the Bishops of the Church of the province of South Africa agreed to the formation of a separate Diocese of Kimberley and Kuruman, Kimberley, soon to be officially a city, had for long eclipsed Barkly West in size and importance, both civil and ecclesiastical.
