= Diocese of George =

The Diocese of George is a diocese in the Anglican Church of Southern Africa.

== History ==
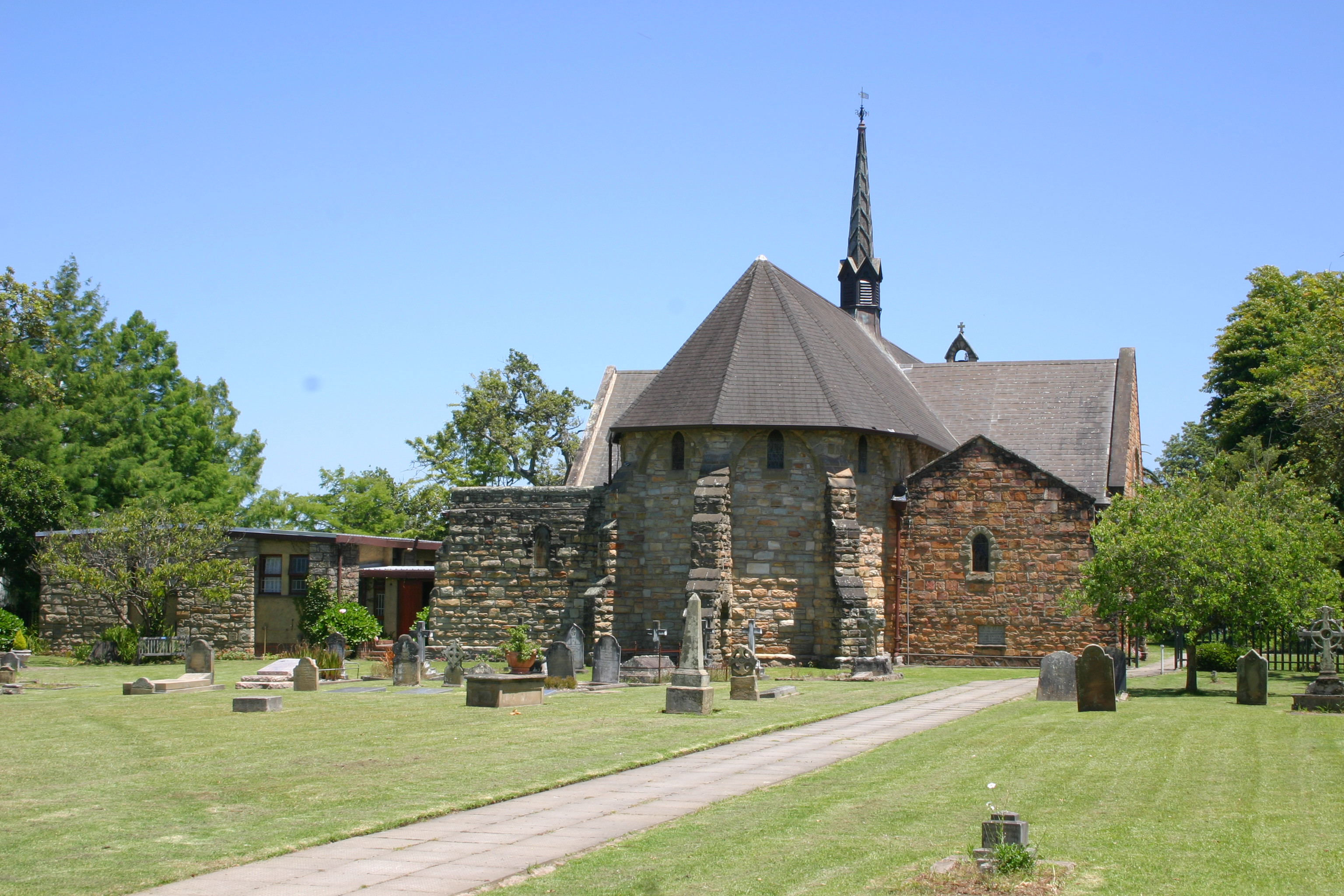
St Mark's Cathedral

The seat of the diocese is the Cathedral of St Mark in George in South Africa.

== List of Bishops ==
- Henry Bindley Sidwell 1911-1936
- Herbert Linford Gwyer 1937-1951
- John Hunter 1951-1966
- Patrick Harold Falkiner Barron 1966-1978
- William James Manning 1974-1984
- Derek George Damant 1984-1999
- Donald Frederick Harker 1999-2010
- Brian Melvin Marajh 2011-2021
- Edwin Pockpass 2023

== Coat of arms ==
Arms of the Diocese of George

The diocese assumed arms at the time of its inception, and had them granted by the College of Arms in 1953 : Argent, on water in base barry wavy an ancient ship under sail to the sinister proper, within a bordure Azure charged with eight plates, a canton Vair thereon a celestial crown Or surmounted by an anchor Sable.
