= Itumeleng Moseki =

Anglican bishop

Itumeleng Baldwin Moseki (born 1940) was the eleventh Bishop of Kimberley and Kuruman from 1995 until his retirement in 2006. He was also a campaigner for the poor.

Religious titles
Preceded by Winston Njongonkulu Ndungane	Bishop of Kimberley and Kuruman; 1995–2006	Succeeded by Oswald Swartz
