= Njongonkulu Ndungane =

Archbishop of Cape Town

The Most Reverend Njongonkulu Ndungane FKC
- Archbishop Emeritus of Cape Town former Primate of the Anglican Church of Southern Africa
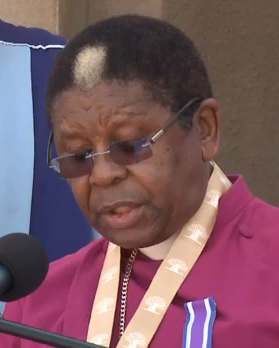
- Church: Anglican
- Province: Southern Africa
- See: Cape Town
- Installed: 24 September 1996
- Term ended: 31 December 2007
- Predecessor: Desmond Tutu
- Successor: Thabo Makgoba
- Previous post: Bishop of Kimberley and Kuruman

Orders
- Ordination: 1974
- Consecration: 1991

Personal details
- Born: 2 April 1941 (age 85) Kokstad
- Education: King's College London

Njongonkulu Winston Hugh Ndungane (born 2 April 1941) is a retired South African Anglican bishop and a former prisoner on Robben Island. He was the Bishop of Kimberley and Kuruman and Archbishop of Cape Town.

== Early life ==
Ndungane was born in Kokstad. He attended Lovedale High School, Alice, Eastern Cape and completed his schooling there in December 1958.

== Political life and imprisonment ==
In March 1960 he was involved in anti-Pass Law demonstrations while a student at the University of Cape Town and was later arrested for his anti-apartheid activities. From August 1963 he served a three-year sentence on Robben Island as a political prisoner. On his release he was served with a two-year banning order.

== Church ministry ==
Ndungane decided to seek ordination during his imprisonment on Robben Island. In 1971 the Most Reverend Robert Selby Taylor, Archbishop of Cape Town, sent him to St Peter’s College, Alice, Eastern Cape. He was ordained a deacon in December 1973 and a priest in July 1974. He served his first curacy in Athlone, Cape Town in the Diocese of Cape Town. In 1975 he left South Africa for King's College London, where he earned his Bachelor of Divinity and Master of Theology degrees while he was a curate in London.

After his time in London he had a short time as an assistant chaplain at St George’s Church in Paris. He returned to South Africa in 1980 and was appointed the rector of St Nicholas' Matroosfontein. Phillip Russell, archbishop of Cape Town, appointed him as his representative in the Diocese of Johannesburg

In 1984 he was mandated by Archbishop Russell to take responsibility for reopening St Bede’s Theological College, Umtata, which had been closed. In 1985 he was appointed principal of St Bede’s.

In 1991 he was elected Bishop of Kimberley and Kuruman. In September 1996 he was elected archbishop of Cape Town and Metropolitan of the Anglican Church of Southern Africa.

In 2006, he founded African Monitor, a pan-African non-profit organization that monitors both the fulfillment of the promises of both aid-giving and aid-receiving countries.

== Awards ==
- Order of the Baobab in Silver (2008)
- Doctor of Divinity (honoris causa) Rhodes University
- Freedom of the City of Cape Town (2016)

== Publications ==
- Primate Speaks Out on Debt and Arms. Anglican Communion Office. 1997.
- Oppression, Faith and the Future: The Archbishop of Cape Town : a Conversation With, and Address by the Most Revd Njongonkulu Ndungane. Great St. Mary's. 1997.
- Address[es] by the Archbishop of Cape Town the Most Reverend Njongonkulu Ndungane, at a Conference on "Local Communities, Global Realities" Held in Toronto, Canada, June 21, 1999. 1999.
- A World with a Human Face: A Voice from Africa. David Philip. 2003. ISBN 978-0-86486-614-1.
- "Don't cut aid to Africa now". The Guardian. Guardian News and Media Limited. 2009.

Anglican Church of Southern Africa titles
Preceded by George Alfred Swartz	Bishop of Kimberley and Kuruman; 1991 – 1996	Succeeded by Itumeleng Baldwin Moseki
Preceded by Desmond Tutu	Anglican Archbishop of Cape Town; 1996 – 2007	Succeeded by Thabo Makgoba
