= Charles May (bishop) =

South African Anglican priest

The Right Reverend Mthetheleli Charles May is an Anglican bishop in South Africa. He was elected as bishop by the Synod of Bishops sitting in Johannesburg in May 2015. He was consecrated and enthroned as bishop of the Highveld on 12 September 2015.

He was previously the Dean of Johannesburg.
