= Derek Damant =

South African bishop (died 2021)

Derek George Damant was the sixth bishop of George.

He was educated at University of South Africa and ordained in 1958. He began his career as chaplain at St. Andrew's School, Bloemfontein after which he was founding head master at St. Stephen's Diocesan High School in Mohale's Hoek. He then moved to Pretoria where he became Chaplain of St Alban's College. From 1975 he was dean of Pretoria. He ascended to the episcopate in 1985 and retired in 1999.

Damant died in July 2021.
