= Barkly West =

Barkly West: Barkly-Wes (Afrikaans); !a |aub (Korana)
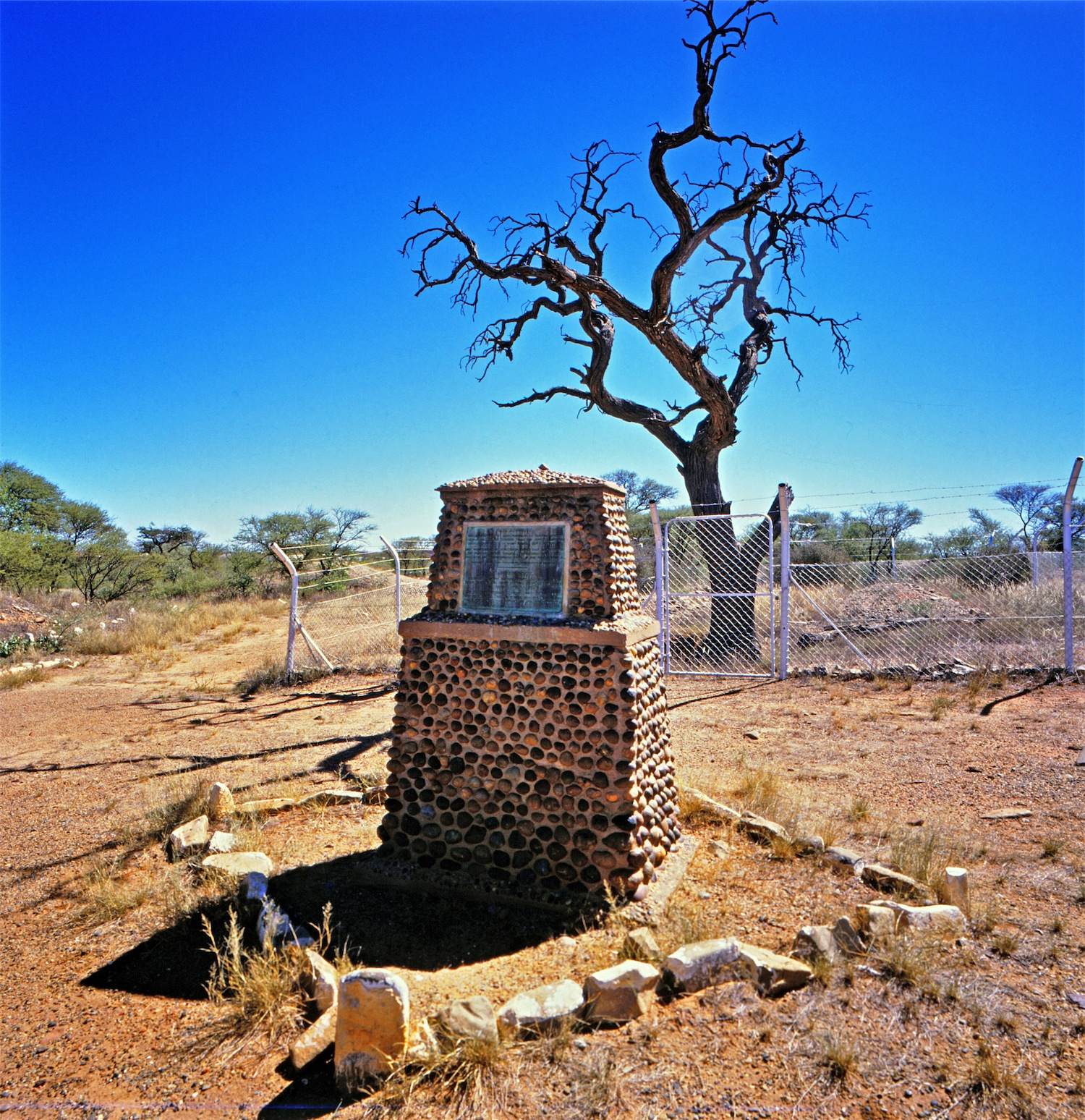

- Location within Northern Cape Location within South Africa
- Coordinates: 28°32′17″S 24°31′07″E
- Country: South Africa
- Province: Northern Cape
- District: Frances Baard
- Municipality: Dikgatlong

Area
  - Total: 73.1 km^{2} (28.2 sq mi)

Population (2011)
  - Total: 20,105
  - Density: 275/km^{2} (712/sq mi)

Racial makeup (2011)
  - Black African: 71.7%
  - Coloured: 22.6%
  - Indian/Asian: 0.4%
  - White: 3.7%
  - Other: 1.6%

First languages (2011)
  - Tswana: 60.3%
  - Afrikaans: 31.4%
  - English: 2.3%
  - Sotho: 1.8%
  - Other: 4.1%
- Time zone: UTC+2 (SAST)
- Postal code (street): 8375
- PO box: 8375
- Area code: 053

Barkly West is a town in the Northern Cape province of South Africa, situated on the north bank of the Vaal River west of Kimberley.

== Establishment and naming ==
Barkly West was initially known as Klip Drift (sometimes written as Klipdrift). This Dutch name means "stony ford" and is a direct translation from a much older !Kora or Korana name, Ka-aub (or !a |aub) - "stony (place along a) river". In 1870, it became the site of the first major diamond rush on the South African Diamond Fields. The surrounding area was briefly known as "Klipdrift Diggers' Republic" and the town was renamed Parkerton, in honor of Stafford Parker before colonial rule was extended there. It became, with Kimberley, one of the main towns in the Crown Colony of Griqualand West and was renamed Barkly West (see the article on New Rush). Like Barkly East, the town is named after Sir Henry Barkly, Governor of Cape Colony and High Commissioner for Southern Africa from 1870 to 1877. During the Anglo-Boer War the town was occupied by Boer forces and temporarily went by the name Nieuw Boshof.

Barkly West is sometimes erroneously spelled as "Barkley-West" (even in road signage). In Afrikaans the town is known as Barkly-Wes. The local municipality, post-1994, is called Dikgatlong, part of the Frances Baard District Municipality.

== Heritage sites ==
- The Parish Church of St Mary the Virgin was the first Anglican Church to be built on the Diamond Fields. Sir Henry Barkly laid the foundation stone in February 1871.
- Canteen Kopje is the site of early diamond diggings which also exposed a major archaeological occurrence of stratified Acheulean facies, subject to a current collaborative research venture by the University of Southampton, the University of the Witwatersrand and the McGregor Museum in Kimberley.
- Barkly West Museum situated in the Toll House at the Barkly Bridge (see next).
- The iron Barkly Bridge, the first over the Vaal River, was transported in sections from the United Kingdom (by sea, rail and, over the last more than 100 km by ox wagon) and erected across the Vaal in 1885. A steel plate gives details of its manufacture: "Westwood, Baillie & Co, Engineers and Contractors, London 1884." Shops in Kimberley and Barkly West closed for the occasion when the bridge was opened. A new bridge was built alongside in the 1970s. The toll house erected to recover revenues from those using the old bridge now serves as a museum, opened in 2000.
- The Nooitgedacht Glacial Pavements, upstream along the Vaal River between Barkly West and Kimberley, with evidence of the Dwyka glaciation some 300 million years ago. Much later - within the last 1500 years or so - the scoured rocks were used by Later Stone Age people as panels for rock engravings.

== Notable residents ==
- Renowned writer Sarah Gertrude Millin grew up at Longlands outside Barkly West and her father opened the first shop in town.
- Cecil Rhodes held the seat of Barkly West in the House of Assembly of Cape Colony until his death in 1902.
- Z.K. Matthews (1901 – May 1968), prominent black academic who became a president of the African National Congress and assisted in the drafting of the Freedom Charter, was born at Winters Rush outside Barkly West. The new hospital is named after Professor Z.K. Matthews.
- Mphashane Reginald Leeuw, from Barkly West, was instituted and installed as the Dean of Kimberley, 2015.

== See also ==
- Barkly East
- Siege of Kimberley
