= Diocese of the Highveld =

Diocese of Highveld

Location
- Country: South Africa
- Ecclesiastical province: Southern Africa
- Headquarters: Benoni, Gauteng

Information
- Rite: Anglican
- Established: 1890
- Cathedral: St Dunstan's Cathedral

Current leadership
- Bishop of the Highveld: Charles May
- Metropolitan Archbishop: Thabo Makgoba, Archbishop of Cape Town

Website
- diocesehighveld.org.za

The Diocese of the Highveld (formerly the Diocese of South Eastern Transvaal) is a diocese of the Anglican Church of Southern Africa covering the East Rand in Gauteng province and the southern part of Mpumalanga province in South Africa. The bishop's seat is at St Dunstan's Cathedral in Benoni.

== History ==
The Diocese of the Highveld was formed through a multiplication of the original Anglican Diocese of Johannesburg, which, in geographical terms, embraced the whole of the former Southern Transvaal Province of South Africa. The new diocese extends from the eastern edge of the Metropolis of Johannesburg, Gauteng Province, South Africa, to the borders of the Kingdom of Eswatini. Apart from the urban and industrial areas, forming what is known as the East Rand, in which most of the parishes are situated, much of the Diocese is rural farming land, falling within the Province of Mpumalanga.

On the Feast of the Epiphany, 6 January 1990, the Diocese of South Eastern Transvaal, now Highveld, came into being. David Beetge was elected to lead the diocese; he died on 27 September 2008. On 25 April 2009, David Bannerman was consecrated as bishop.

== List of Bishops ==
- David Beetge 1990–2008
- David Bannerman 2009–2015
- Charles May (elected 25 April 2015, consecrated 13 September 2015)

== Coat of arms ==
Arms of the Diocese of the Highveld

The diocese registered a coat of arms at the Bureau of Heraldry in 1990 : Argent, two flanches Gules, a cross crosslet fitchy Azure; the shield ensigned with a mitre proper.
