= Oswald Swartz =

South African Anglican bishop (born 1953)

The Right Reverend Oswald Swartz
- Bishop of Kimberley and Kuruman
- Church: Anglican
- Diocese: Diocese of Kimberley and Kuruman
- Predecessor: Itumeleng Baldwin Moseki
- Successor: Brian Marajh

Orders
- Consecration: 1 May 2007

Oswald Peter Patrick Swartz (born 1953) is a South African Anglican bishop. He was the twelfth Bishop of Kimberley and Kuruman.

Swartz was born in Kimberley, Northern Cape and educated at St Paul's Theological College, Grahamstown. He was ordained a priest in 1980.

== Early ministry ==
Swartz began his ordained ministry as a curate at St Matthias' Church in Welkom (1980–81) and, following his ordination to the priesthood, was appointed as the rector of St Philip's Bloemfontein (1981 – 1987), serving for some of this time as chaplain to the Company of St Augustine (Diocesan Director of Ordinands).

While in Bloemfontein Swartz initiated the ecumenical movement together with Ivan Abrahams, later presiding bishop of the Methodist Church of South Africa in 1984, this movement carried on as members of the Methodist, Lutheran, Roman Catholic, Dutch Reformed now the Uniting Reformed Church, United Congregational Church of Southern Africa UCCSA and Anglican Churches meet monthly to celebrate and commit themselves to unity.

Swartz was also involved in the community and coached the Free State Women's hockey team inter alia. He also was involved in promoting the arts with John Badenhorst.

== Diocese of Kimberley and Kuruman ==
In 1987 Swartz moved back to the diocese where he was born and where his father, the Revd Canon J.W.M. Swartz, had served as priest. His first posting in the Diocese of Kimberley and Kuruman was as the rector of St John's Mafikeng, from 1987, where he soon was appointed as Archdeacon of Mafikeng (1989 – 1992). He then spent three terms as Bishop's Executive Officer (which position was latterly combined with that of diocesan secretary) under Bishop Njongonkulu Ndungane, in 1992–4, 1994-6 and (under Bishop Itumeleng Baldwin Moseki) in 1996–2000. Concurrently he served as the rector of St Augustine's Kimberley with St Alban's, then St Martin's, Douglas and then of St Barnabas, Kimberley, serving as the Acting Archdeacon of Kimberley.

In 1994-6 Swartz was Sub-Dean at St Cyprian's Cathedral in Kimberley.

== London ==
Swartz went to Britain in 2001 as Regional Desk Officer for the United Society for the Propagation of the Gospel, London (until 2005), responsible for the link with the ecclesiastical provinces of West Africa, Southern Africa and the Indian Ocean. He also served as honorary chaplain at Southwark Cathedral.

== Dean of Pretoria and ordination as a bishop ==
In 2006 Swartz returned to South Africa as the Dean of Pretoria before being elected and ordained to the episcopate in 2007.

== Bishop of Kimberley and Kuruman ==
Swartz was consecrated at St Cyprian's Cathedral on 1 May 2007 and enthroned there as the 12th Bishop of Kimberley and Kuruman on 16 June 2007.

Swartz is married and has three children.

== Publications ==
- Wingate, Andrew; Ward, Kevin; Pemberton, Carrie; et al., eds. (1998). "New Wine, Old wineskins". Anglicanism: A Global Communion. Church Publishing, Inc. ISBN 978-0-89869-304-1.

== Notes and references ==
- Robertson, Alan (2013). Ten Guidelines for a Meaningful Life: A Christian Psychologist's Perspective on the Ten Commandments. WinePress Publishing. ISBN 978-1-4141-2434-6.

Anglican Church of Southern Africa titles
Preceded by Itumeleng Baldwin Moseki	Bishop of Kimberley and Kuruman; 2007 – present	Incumbent
