= Diocese of Kimberley and Kuruman =

Diocese of the Anglican Church of Southern Africa

The Diocese of Kimberley and Kuruman is a diocese in the Anglican Church of Southern Africa, and encompasses the area around Kimberley and Kuruman and overlaps the Northern Cape Province and North West Province of South Africa. It is presided over by the Bishop of Kimberley and Kuruman, until recently Ossie Swartz. On 19 September 2021 the Electoral College of Bishops elected to translate the Right Revd Brian Marajh of George to become the 13th Bishop of Kimberley & Kuruman. The seat of the Bishop of Kimberley and Kuruman is at St Cyprian's Cathedral, Kimberley. There had been so far 12 bishops of the See, though one of these served for two different periods of time.

== Formation of the diocese ==
The Anglican presence on the Diamond Fields and in Kimberley's hinterland, from the early 1870s, was at first administered from Bloemfontein, initially under Allan Webb, the oldest parish here being St Mary's, Barkly West. By the early 1890s, however, there was a feeling in some quarters that the Diocese of Bloemfontein was too big and there were proposals for the formation of a separate bishopric with its seat in Kimberley. But in the event the bishops decided upon establishing the missionary Diocese of Mashonaland instead – an area also up until then administered from Bloemfontein.

From 1907 to 1910 motions were passed and planning and fund-raising initiatives were being conducted in earnest towards founding a new Diocese of Kimberley. These included the "Million Shillings Fund" launched by Arthur Chandler, Bishop of Bloemfontein, in London on 2 February 1909. It was hoped that all would be in place so that the coming into being of the new Diocese would coincide with the establishment of Union in South Africa in 1910. However it was not before July 1911 that all was ready and a formal resolution could be proposed, as it was at a meeting in the Kimberley Town Hall, that ‘the western portion of the Diocese of Bloemfontein be constituted a new and separate Diocese with Kimberley as its Cathedral Town’ – to which the Episcopal Synod, meeting in Maritzburg, gave its final consent in the form of a mandate dated 11 October 1911. The elective assembly for the choosing of a bishop for the new diocese was held in Kimberley on 13 December 1911, at which Wilfrid Gore Browne, Dean of Pretoria, was the unanimous choice. Gore Browne was consecrated in the Bloemfontein Cathedral on 29 June 1912. He was enthroned the following day as bishop of Kimberley and Kuruman, at St Cyprian's Cathedral.

== Geographical extent ==
The Diocese of Kimberley and Kuruman has not been constant in extent and at times less than exactly defined. Taking over the western side of the Diocese of Boemfontein (now "of the Free State"), it also included some of the sparsely populated interior extremities of the Dioceses of Cape Town and of Grahamstown. The southern half of Bechuanaland Protectorate was added om 1915 and remained part of "K&K" (as Kimberley and Kuruman is often called) until Botswana's independence in 1966. This history flavoured liturgical usage there, which still resembles the style more of the South African Prayer Book than the Central African Prayer Book. The 1952 diocesan synod was concerned to establish the boundaries of parishes; noting also a lack of clarity on "where is the Diocese" – "The Bishop called attention ... to the fact that certain places where at present the Diocese has Clergymen at work are not technically in the Diocese."

== Bishops ==
Tenure	Incumbent	Notes
1912 to 1928	Wilfrid Gore Browne	(1859–1928)
1928 to 1943	Theodore Sumner Gibson	(1885–1953)
1943 to 1951	John Hunter	(1897–1965)
1951 to 1960	John Boys	(1900–1972)
1961 to 1965	Philip William Wheeldon	(1913–1992)
1965 to 1967	Clarence Edward Crowther	(1929-2021)
1968 to 1976	Philip William Wheeldon (2nd spell)	(Ibid)
1976 to 1983	Graham Charles Chadwick	(1923–2007)
1983 to 1991	George Alfred Swartz	(1928–2006)
1991 to 1996	Winston Njongonkulu Ndungane	(b 1941)
1996 to 2006	Itumeleng Baldwin Moseki	(1944-2026)
2007 to 2020	Oswald Swartz	(b 1953–)
2021 to present	Brian Marajh	(b 1960–)

== Notable clergy and people ==
Besides the bishops of the see (above) and the Deans of Kimberley (see also the early Rectors of St Cyprian's), notable clergy and people of the diocese have included: The so-called "Big Three" pioneer missionary priests of the diocese, W.H.R. Bevan of Phokwane; George Mervyn Lawson, archdeacon of Griqualand West; and Frederick William Peasley of Bothithong; Henrietta Stockdale, a sister of the Community of St Michael and All Angels; Levi Kraai, ordained by Gore-Browne in 1913; J. W. Mogg, who served the diocese from 1915 to 1945; Walter Wade, of St Matthew's Barkly Road, Archdeacon of Bechuanaland and of Kimberley, and afterwards Dean of Umtata and Suffragan Bishop of Cape Town; Joseph Thekiso, an archdeacon; Theo Naledi, afterwards Bishop of Botswana; Richard Stanley Cutts, an archdeacon, afterwards Dean of Salisbury and later the bishop of Buenos Aires; Alan Butler, latterly director of the Kuruman Moffat Mission; George Pressly; John William Salt, afterwards dean of Eshowe and bishop of St Helena; Kimberley-born Brian Marajh, bishop of George; Kimberley-born Margaret Vertue, bishop of False Bay and second woman to be elected as a bishop of the Anglican Church of Southern Africa and of the whole African continent.

== Current archdeaconries and parishes ==
Some of the parishes in the diocese date back to the beginnings of Anglican work on the Diamond Fields and in Kimberley's hinterland, for example St Mary's, Barkly West and the Cathedral Parish of St Cyprian. They have multiplied in number, various parishes being subdivided or consolidated through time. It follows that boundaries have not been unchanging. The archdeaconry structure has been even more dynamic, responding to the needs of the day at different periods. In 2010 an experimental division between north and south was replaced when the archdeaconries of the Molopo, the Kgalagadi and the Karoo, additional to the Cathedral archdeaconry, were created. Currently these administrative units are the archdeaconries of the Cathedral, The Diamond Fields, Gariep, Kgalagadi, and Molopo, embracing the following parishes (Schedule of Archdeaconries as of May 2017):

=== Cathedral ===
- The Cathedral Church of St Cyprian the Martyr, Kimberley.
- St Alban's, De Beers

=== Archdeaconry of the Diamond Fields ===
- All Saints, Homevale
- St Matthew's, Barkly Road
- St Barnabas, Florianville
- St Mary Magdalene, Ritchie
- St Augustine's, West End
- St Paul's, Vergenoeg
- St Peter's, Greenpoint
- St Mary the Virgin, Barkly West – the oldest Parish Church in the Diocese
- St Francis, Roodepan
- St James, Galeshewe

=== Archdeaconry of Gariep ===
- All Saints, Paballelo
- St Andrew's, Prieska
- St Philip's, Boegoeberg
- St Matthew's, Oranjekruin, Upington
- Annunciation, Douglas
- St Luke's, Prieska
- Good Shepherd, Nonzwakazi, De Aar
- St Martin's, Breipaal, Douglas
- St Thomas, De Aar

[with St Anne's, Niekerkshoop; St Paul's, Marydale; St Barnabas, Britstown; St Andrew's, Philipstown; St Matthew's, Richmond]

=== Archdeaconry of the Kgalagadi ===
- St Mary-le-Bourne, Kuruman
- St Monica, Tsineng
- St Paul's, Mothibistad
- St Timothy, Seoding
- St Wilfred, Maruping
- St Peter's Wrenchville
- St Laurence, Danielskuil
- St John's, Bothithong
- St Michael and All Angels, Batlharos
- St Francis, Manyeding
- Good Shepherd, Bendel

Several of these parishes have numerous outstations

=== Archdeaconry of the Molopo ===
- Resurrection, Mmabatho
- All Saints, Montshiwa
- St John the Evangelist, Mafikeng
- Transfiguration, Setlagole
- St Michael and All Angels, Lomanyaneng
- Holy Cross, Pudimong
- St Chad's, Taung
- St Mary's, Matalong
- All Saints, Pampierstad
- St Peter's, Ganyesa
- St Hubert's, Hartsvaal Parish
- St Augustine's Hartsvaal
- St George, Warrenton
- St Peter's, Ikhutseng
- St Stephen's, Vryburg
- St Philip's, Huhudi
- St John, Tlakgameng

Several of these parishes have numerous outstations

Arms of the diocese

== Coat of arms ==
The diocese assumed arms at the time of its inception, and had them granted by the College of Arms in 1953 : Per pale Argent and Sable, a cross potent counterchanged within a bordure Azure charged with eleven lozenges of the first.

== Relationship with Oxford ==
The diocese has a link partnership with the Diocese of Oxford, established in 1993. Visits by John Pritchard, Bishop of Oxford, to Kimberley and Kuruman in 2008 and 2010, by Bishop Oswald Swartz to Lambeth Palace (and Oxford) in 2008, and by other senior clergy and people from both sides of the link, strengthened partnerships with focus areas on HIV/Aids and other key projects. The Dean of Kimberley, the Very Revd Reginald Leeuw, represented his diocese at the inauguration of the Rt Revd Dr Steven Croft as Bishop of Oxford in 2016. A large contingent flew with Bishop Croft to Kimberley for a Link Summit in 2017, and a meeting on environmental issues followed in Oxford a year later. A planned Link Summit to have taken place in Oxford in 2020 was called off owing to the COVID-19 pandemic.
