= Thomas Robson (priest) =

South African Anglican priest

The Very Revd Thomas Claude Robson (died 1934) was the first Anglican Dean of Kimberley, and Rector of St Cyprian's Cathedral, Kimberley, South Africa.

== Background and prospects at St Cyprian’s in 1905 ==
Canon Robson came to St Cyprian's Church in 1905, a Parish still worshiping in a wood and iron church in Jones Street, Kimberley, a structure imported as a prefabricated kit from England in 1879. Grand plans for a new church had been proposed in a public meeting in 1901, but little progress had been made towards their realisation. Archdeacon William Arthur Holbech, who had been Rector at the time, had gone on to become Dean of Bloemfontein. Robson's predecessor, Archdeacon H.A. Douglas-Hamilton, was appointed in 1903, encountering an impatient faction within the congregation who additionally were at odds with the Archdeacon's churchmanship – specifically with respect to liturgical practices. This faction removed itself from the parish, building its own brick church of St John the Evangelist in Woodley Street – a parish of decidedly low church persuasion. Prospects for the new rector could hardly have seemed less auspicious.

== Robson’s achievement ==
And yet Thomas Claude Robson, presiding over the parish for very nearly three decades, would oversee perhaps the greatest transformation in the history of St Cyprian's: the design of a cathedral; the completion of the first two major phases of this long-term project; and the building up of a mother church for a new and vast diocese. St Cyprian's would no longer simply be a parish church. A newspaper feature in 1923, on ‘Men in the Public Eye’, pronounced: “He is the Dean of Kimberley and Kimberley loves its Dean.”

== Milestones of Robson’s Kimberley career ==
- 5 March 1907 – the foundation stone for what would soon become St Cyprian's Cathedral was laid by Bishop William Thomas Gaul of Mashonaland. “Considerable anxiety was expressed by many even unconnected with the Anglican Church,” reported the local press, “that the building to be erected should be worthy of the great place it will in all probability occupy as the future Cathedral of the Diocese of Griqualand West and Bechuanaland.”
- 13 May 1908 – the dedication of the first part of the cathedral building, the nave, by the Vicar General from Bloemfontein, the Ven Archdeacon J. R. Vincent, assisted by Kimberley's Archdeacon Weekes and the Rector, T.C. Robson. ‘Achieved is the glorious work’, from Haydn's Creation, was sung as an anthem at Festal Evensong that evening, when an augmented choir was accompanied by an orchestra under direction of St Cyprian's organist Mr Sidney H. Rees.
- 11 October 1911 – Episcopal Synod, meeting in Pietermaritzburg consented to the formation of a Kimberley Diocese.
- 30 June 1912 – Bishop Wilfrid Gore Browne enthroned as 1st Bishop of Kimberley and Kuruman at St Cyprian's Cathedral.
- With the elevation of St Cyprian's to Cathedral status, its Rector, Canon T.C. Robson, was invited to become the first Dean of Kimberley. Initially he was incapacitated by illness and, by default, Bishop Gore Browne was closely involved in the parish, and for a time kept it going single-handed.

The building up of the Cathedral as a unifying symbol of the diocese was part of Robson's vision: he believed, as he put it in the Cathedral News in 1916, that “if the Cathedral suffers the whole Diocese suffers, but if the Cathedral prospers the whole Diocese prospers.”

- 22 September 1913 – the second major phase of work towards the completion of the cathedral building was launched when the Governor General laid the Foundation Stone for the Choir and Sanctuary. Looking still further ahead, a tower fund was established in 1914 — though nearly half a century more would elapse before the tower was built.
- 1914 – the outbreak of the Great War had a profound impact in Kimberley. There was an exodus of young men—too many of them never to return. The Kimberley mines were closed. Then, in 1918, the deadly influenza epidemic devastated the city. When work on the Chancel eventually was taken up again after the war, it came to be dedicated as a memorial to those of the parish who had died in the war. The magnificent soaring windows set high up at the back of the nave, at the west end of the Cathedral, were erected to the memory of one of the parish's sons, Lieut William Newby, R.A.F., killed in action in France in 1918, and buried at Rejet-de-Beaulieu. The high altar bears an inscription to another serviceman, Geoffrey Selwyn Brown, who made it back from the war but died soon after from scarlet fever. An unusual inscription is that on the altar rail (so well polished that it is now barely visible), in memory of Leonard George Sherriff, who died in 1925. Sherriff had won a prestigious scholarship to train as an engineer in the Royal Navy, and he served in the Great War, becoming involved in pioneering submarine experiments. He caught a chill at Gibraltar in 1924, from which he never recovered, and he died, aged 26, at his parents’ residence in Kimberley.
- 4 December 1926 – the Chancel of the Cathedral was dedicated by the Archbishop of Cape Town, The Most Revd William Marlborough Carter.
- 15 March 1928 – Bishop Wilfrid Gore Browne died. Three windows in the apse, depicting the Archangels Raphael, Michael and Gabriel, were dedicated to his memory. A window depicting the bishop himself was set above the choir in 1988, with a dedication to all founders and benefactors.
- 1933 – Dean Robson commissioned the carving of a pulpit which would be a memorial to his predecessor as Rector, and later Bishop of Mashonaland, William Thomas Gaul — who had laid the foundation stone of the Cathedral in 1907.
- 10 September 1934 – Thomas Claude Robson died in Kimberley. More than 2000 people attended the funeral: 300-400 cars went to the cemetery. In one of many tributes, Kimberley's Rabbi Konviser — who remembered receiving greetings from the Dean “written in most scholarly and correct Hebrew phraseology” — admired Robson as a man “free from cant and prejudice,” to be “remembered by men of all creeds”. His death marked the close of a remarkable era in the history of St Cyprian's Cathedral.

Anglican Church of Southern Africa titles
Preceded by Inaugural	Dean of Kimberley; 1912 –1934	Succeeded by Hugh Scott Chignell
