= St Cyprian's Cathedral, Kimberley =

Coordinates: 28°44′33″S 24°46′14″E

St Cyprian the Martyr Cathedral
- Cathedral Church of St Cyprian the Martyr
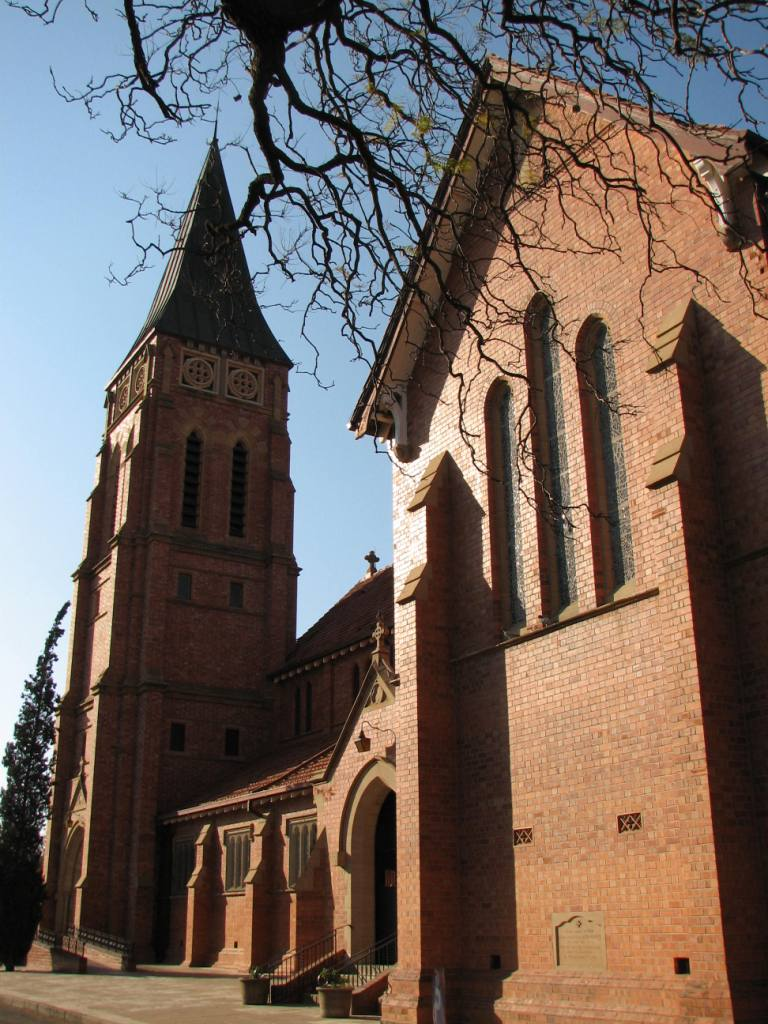
- St Cyprian's Cathedral: south transept and tower
- St Cyprian the Martyr Cathedral
- Location: 129 Du Toitspan Road, Kimberley
- Country: South Africa
- Denomination: Anglican

History
- Founded: Parish founded 1871
- Dedication: St Cyprian
- Dedicated: Present building dedicated 13 May 1908

Architecture
- Architect: Arthur Lindley with D.W. Greatbatch
- Style: Gothic Revival
- Completed: Dedication of Nave in 1908

Administration
- Province: Anglican Church of Southern Africa
- Diocese: Diocese of Kimberley and Kuruman
- Archdeaconry: Cathedral Archdeaconry within the Archdeaconry of the Karoo

Clergy
- Dean: The Very Revd Fr Reginald Leeuw

The Cathedral Church of St Cyprian the Martyr, Kimberley, is the seat of the Bishop of the Kimberley and Kuruman, Anglican Church of Southern Africa. The building was dedicated in 1908, becoming a Cathedral when the Synod of Bishops mandated formation of the new Diocese of Kimberley and Kuruman in October 1911. The first Bishop, the Rt Revd Wilfrid Gore Browne, was enthroned there on 30 June 1912.

The Parish of St Cyprian dates back to 1871 when a chapelry of the Parish of All Saints, Du Toit's Pan, Diocese of Bloemfontein, at first met in a tent in the nearby New Rush, on the Diamond Fields, a place later renamed Kimberley.

== Beginnings ==
Churches in diggers' camps on the South African Diamond Fields met initially in tents in 1870–71. The first Anglican Church to be built was St Mary's in Barkly West. The nascent St Cyprian's congregation gathered later in a metal-roofed building, the Odd Fellows Hall near the Market Square and, from 1880 to 1908, in Jones Street, in a prefabricated wood-and-iron building which had been imported from England.

The first rector was Fr John Witherston Rickards, previously a curate at St Cyprian's, Marylebone, London. He was appointed by the Bishop of Bloemfontein, the Rt Revd Allan Webb, being diverted from Modderpoort to the Diamond Fields when he arrived in 1871.

The writer J. W. Matthews recalled the "primitive state of things existing" in church matters when he reached the Diamond Fields in November 1871: worshippers gathered in a canvas tent billiard-room:

"On entering I beheld a full-robed clergyman officiating at one end of a billiard-table, which served for his reading desk, whilst a large and attentive crowd sat around the other end, some on rude benches which were fixed along the walls, others perched upon gin cases, buckets reversed, or any other make-shift [sic] that came to hand. The congregation behaved with suitable decorum, but I confess it was not easy to keep the mind from wandering to the incongruity of the surroundings. ..When the parson was praying or the people singing, it was not particularly edifying to be interrupted by the lively chaff and occasional bursts of blasphemy, which we could plainly hear through the canvas party-walls, which separated us from the adjoining bar and its half tipsy occupants".

Rickards promoted the cause of education in Kimberley (three schools originated from this work). A Mission School, later called Perseverance, was established in his day, as were a school for boys and one for girls. St Cyprian's Boys' School – known also as St Cyprian's Grammar School – under headmaster Thomas McLaren was established in March 1876: "For several years this was one of the best schools in Kimberley."

The Revd C.B. Maude, a later rector of the parish, related that: "We have a canvas house for our sitting room and a wooden one for our bedroom. The floors are made of brick dried in the sun, but the legs of beds or tables make holes in them... The church floor is of mud and so is very dusty. It is a low building with an iron roof and when it rains we have to give up the service as we cannot be heard!"

During Maude's incumbency a prefabricated church building was imported from England. The foundation stone was laid in 1879 by Sir Charles Warren. As its erection neared completion, it was blown to the ground by a whirlwind; but on Low Sunday 1880 Bishop Webb of Bloemfontein dedicated the re-erected building and instituted C.B. Maude as Rector of Kimberley.

In August 1884 the Vicar General of the Diocese of Bloemfontein, Archdeacon D.G. Croghan, appointed Canon William Thomas Gaul as Rector of St Cyprian's Kimberley. In Gaul's appointment, Croghan noted, St Cyprian's assumed first place among the Anglican parishes in Kimberley. Gaul subsequently became Rural Dean of Griqualand West and Archdeacon of Kimberley, and served the parish until 1895 when he was elected to succeed George Wyndham Knight-Bruce as second Bishop of Mashonaland.

== Becoming a Cathedral ==
The idea of building a "more worthy parish church" was mooted in 1901, when the former rector Bishop Gaul of Mashonaland, chided the St Cyprian's congregation for continuing to worship in a "tin shanty": he was referring to the wood and iron church in Jones Street built in 1879–80. The foundation stone for the Neo-Gothic church building that would become the Cathedral was laid (by Bishop Gaul) on 5 March 1907 and the completed Nave was dedicated on 13 May 1908. St Cyprian's Church became a Cathedral when Episcopal Synod approved the formation of the new Diocese of Kimberley and Kuruman in October 1911, the first Bishop, Gore Browne, being enthroned in 1912. The foundation stone for the Chancel was laid in 1913, but war intervened and it was completed only in 1926 – as a war memorial. The Lady Chapel was added in memory of Dean Robson in 1936 (when a vestry and a new organ, by J. W. Walker & Sons Ltd, were also built). The building was brought nearer to completion in 1961 with the dedication of the bell tower – which was built closely following the original cathedral design (the architect had been Arthur Lindley of the firm of Greatbatch). A watercolour impression of the anticipated Chancel was painted by William M. Timlin, artist and architect, and a partner in Greatbatch & Timlin, who guided some of the later phases of construction. Funds for the building of the tower were given in memory of parishioners who lost their lives in World War II. The funeral service of World War II RAF veteran "Sailor" Malan, a South African fighter pilot who became famous during the Battle of Britain, was held here in 1963.

Stained glass windows, plaques, furnishings and ornaments have been added by succeeding generations. Complementing earlier twentieth century glass, the Holy Spirit windows in the south transept, of thick scintillating glass set in concrete, are by the Pretoria artist Leo Theron.

A cathedral hall and office complex was built in 1979.

Adjacent to the cathedral, a garden of remembrance was consecrated on 5 March 2007 as part of the cathedral's centenary. The bronze statue within it, by Jack Penn, commemorates Sister Henrietta Stockdale, 1847–1911, of the Community of St Michael and All Angels, a nursing pioneer who brought about the first state registration of nurses in the world. It had been unveiled by Bishop Wheeldon in 1970. The graves of Sister Henrietta and of two fellow workers were reinterred alongside in 1984; nearby lie the re-interred remains of Archdeacon George Mervyn Lawson, 1865–1945, Director of Missions for Griqualand West from 1903 and Archdeacon of Kuruman, 1913–1941.

== Cathedral and Diocesan Centenaries and reinstitution of the St Cyprian's Grammar School ==
The centenary of the building was celebrated in 2007–8, with major events including the first return visit in 40 years by deported Bishop C.E. Crowther; the consecration (1 May 2007) and enthronement (16 June 2007) of Bishop Oswald Swartz and services commemorating the laying of the foundation stone (5 March 2007) and the dedication of the building (13 May 2008)

Arising from the cathedral's centenary was the reinstitution of the St Cyprian's Grammar School, which had existed more than a hundred years previously as part of the mission of the St Cyprian's Parish Church in the late nineteenth century. The school opened on 21 January 2009 and was dedicated on the cathedral's dedication feast, 13 May 2009, when the Head Student was instituted and the Head of the School and Chaplain each received the Bishop's licence.

The centenary of the establishment of the Anglican Diocese of Kimberley and Kuruman in 1911/12 commenced with the Diocesan Family Weekend in September 2011. The diocese also recalled Sister Henrietta Stockdale on 6 October 2011, on the centenary of her death.

== Music at St Cyprian's ==
William Crisp recorded that within a year of the establishment of the parish, a vested choir was in existence and was accompanied by a harmonium. In 1874 an organ, purchased from the Commemoration Church in Grahamstown, replaced the harmonium, and was itself replaced by an imported instrument from England in 1880. This second organ, with a colourful history recounted by A. Pierce Jones in a 1924 article on "The Adventures of an Organ", was transferred to the new building erected in 1907–8, soon to be a cathedral. In 1936 J. W. Walker & Sons Ltd built the organ which is still in use at St Cyprian's.

The St Cyprian's Choir was enrolled with the Guild of Church Musicians in 1909.

In January 2013 the cathedral hosted the 49th Summer School of the Royal School of Church Music (South Africa); the first time that the Summer School had been held in Kimberley.

== Rectors and Deans at St Cyprian's and the Bishops under whom they served ==
=== The early Rectors of St Cyprian's ===
The following priests served as Rector of St Cyprian's Parish, Kimberley, between 1871 and 1912, when it became a Cathedral:

- John Witherston Rickards, 1871–1876
- Neville Borton, 1876–1877
- C.B. Maude, 1877–1881
- Charles Oswald Miles, 1881–1882
- W. F. J. Hanbury, 1882–1884, assisted by Fr John T. Darragh who later founded St John's College, Johannesburg
- William Thomas Gaul M.A. 1884–1895, later the second Bishop of Mashonaland
- William Arthur Holbech, 1895–1902, later Bishop of St Helena
- Arthur Sutton Valpy, Canon of Winchester Cathedral, 1902 (Acting)
- H.A. Douglas-Hamilton, 1903–1905
- Thomas Claude Robson, April 1905

=== Deans of Kimberley ===
From 1912, when St Cyprian's became the Cathedral Church of the Diocese of Kimberley and Kuruman, the Rector was automatically also the Dean of Kimberley. The following clergy have served as Deans of the Kimberley:

- 1905–1934: Thomas Robson (Dean from 1912)
- 1935–1941: Hugh Scott Chignell
- 1941–1953: Francis Smith
- 1953–1959: Arthur Attwell, later Rector of Workington, then Bishop of Sodor and Man
- 1959–1964: Kenneth Oram, later Bishop of Grahamstown
- 1964–1965: Edward Crowther, later Bishop of Kimberley and Kuruman
- 1965–1974: George A. Pullen
- 1975–1978: Thomas Stanage, later Bishop Suffragan, Johannesburg, and Bishop of Bloemfontein
- 1978–1991: Roy Snyman
- 1992–2002: Justus Marcus, later Regional Bishop of Saldanha Bay in the Diocese of Cape Town, 2002–2003
- 2003–2010: Brian Beck
- 2010–2014: Simon Aiken, later Dean of Benoni
- 2015–2024: Reginald Leeuw

=== Subdeans ===
Subdeans have been: David Hart TSSF, Owen Franklin, Oswald Swartz (afterwards Dean of Pretoria and Bishop of Kimberley and Kuruman, 2007-2020).

=== Precentors ===
Precentors have been: John William Salt OGS (afterwards Dean of Eshowe and Bishop of St Helena) and Keith Thomas.

=== The Bishops of Bloemfontein (to 1912) ===
St Cyprian's initially was a Parish within the Diocese of Bloemfontein under the following Bishops:

- Allan Becher Webb, 1871–1883
- George Wyndham Knight-Bruce, 1886–1891
- John Wale Hicks, 1892–1899
- Vicar General John Ranulph Vincent, Dean of Bloemfontein, during the Sede Vacante, 1899–1902
- Arthur Chandler, 1902–1912 (when the first Bishop of Kimberley and Kuruman was enthroned at St Cyprian's Cathedral).

=== The Bishops of Kimberley and Kuruman (from 1912) ===
The Bishops of Kimberley and Kuruman have occupied the Bishop's Throne, dedicated to St Edward, since Gore Browne's enthronement on 30 June 1912:

- Wilfrid Gore Browne, 1912–1928
- Theodore Sumner Gibson, 1928–1943
- John Hunter, 1943–1952
- John Boys, 1953–1960
- Philip William Wheeldon OBE, 1961–1965
- Clarence Edward Crowther, 1965–1967
- Philip William Wheeldon OBE, 1968–1976
- Graham Charles Chadwick, 1976–1983
- George Alfred Swartz, 1983–1991
- Njongonkulu Ndungane, 1991–1995, afterwards Metropolitan Archbishop of Cape Town
- Itumeleng Baldwin Moseki, 1995–2006
- Oswald Swartz, 2007–2020
- Brian Marajh - translated from the Diocese of George on 19 September 2021
