= Borton =

Borton may refer to:

== People ==
- Amyas Borton (1886–1969), British air marshal, brother of Arthur
- Arthur Borton (1883–1933), British Army and Navy officer who won the Victoria Cross
- Arthur Borton (British Army general) (1814–1893), Governor of Malta
- Babe Borton (1888–1954), American baseball player
- Hugh Borton (1903–1995), American historian
- Neville Borton, Vicar of Burwell, Cambridge
- Nick Borton (born 1969), senior British Army officer
- Pam Borton (born 1965), American women's basketball coach
- Tom Borton (1956–2011), American jazz saxophonist, songwriter and composer

== Places ==
- Borton, Illinois, an unincorporated town in the United States
