= John Rickards (priest) =

John Witherston Rickards
- Born: 22 January 1844; Kullumghee, India
- Died: 21 June 1921 (aged 77); Dixton, Monmouthshire
- Occupation: Priest

John Witherston Rickards (22 January 1844 – 21 June 1921), priest, founded the Anglican Parish of St Cyprian the Martyr at New Rush, Kimberley, on the South African Diamond Fields, in 1871. He served a curacy at St Cyprian's, Marylebone, London, and following his time in South Africa he was vicar of Dixton in Monmouthshire, from 1886 until his death in 1921.

== Early life ==
Rickards was born at Kullumghee, India in 1844, the son of Lieutenant-Colonel John Witherston and Louise (née Carthew) Rickards. He was educated at Sherborne School and Gonville and Caius College, Cambridge, where he graduated with a B.A. in 1867.

== St Cyprian's, Marylebone ==
Ordained deacon in 1867 and priest in 1868, Rickards served as a curate first at Ringwood (1867-8) and then under Charles Gutch at a church mission called St Cyprian's, Marylebone (1868–70). St Cyprian's “was a centre of numerous works of mercy; a light spot amidst the dullness of London by-streets”. A contemporary description refers to the “little church" as "a quaint building consisting of the front rooms of a house in Park Street, with the yard behind them and the stable in the mews at the back, the upper storey of which formed the choir, the stable itself the vestry. Underneath it the yard, which had been a coal store, was roofed over and had a skylight, and a flight of many steps led up to the sanctuary. A surpliced choir was an unusual sight in the ‘60s, except in cathedrals and special advanced churches, and the daily celebration, which was carried on in this little sanctuary for 36 years, was something still more strange. About 150 people could be squeezed in, when all the gangways were filled up, and the services were very hearty and the congregation regular and devoted”.

Bishop Robert Gray of Cape Town visited St Cyprian's Marylebone on St Cyprian's Day 1870 and it is surmised that his sermon and call for recruits to the church in South Africa had inspired Rickards. Frederick Noel mentions only that “the missionary spirit urged him to make his way in 1870 to South Africa.”

Today, St Cyprian's, Clarence Gate, Marylebone, occupies a Neo-Gothic building perhaps only dreamt of in Gutch's (and Rickards') day.

== St Cyprian's, Kimberley ==
Upon his arrival in South Africa Rickards was to have joined the Missionary Brotherhood of St Augustine of Hippo at Modderpoort in the eastern Free State, in the Diocese of Bloemfontein – but he was instead diverted westwards to the newly discovered Diamond Fields, where Bishop Webb felt the needs were greater. Here Rickards laid the basis for the Parish which began in a tent and is today the Cathedral Church of St Cyprian the Martyr in Kimberley.

The writer J. W. Matthews would recall something of the “primitive state of things existing”, as far as ecclesiastical arrangements were concerned, on his first arrival at the Diamond Fields in November 1871: worshipers gathered in a canvas tent billiard-room:

“On entering I beheld a full-robed clergyman officiating at one end of a billiard-table, which served for his reading desk, whilst a large and attentive crowd sat around the other end, some on rude benches which were fixed along the walls, others perched upon gin cases, buckets reversed, or any other make-shift that came to hand. The congregation behaved with suitable decorum, but I confess it was not easy to keep the mind from wandering to the incongruity of the surroundings. ..When the parson was praying or the people singing, it was not particularly edifying to be interrupted by the lively chaff and occasional bursts of blasphemy, which we could plainly hear through the canvas party-walls, which separated us from the adjoining bar and its half tipsy occupants.”

Fr Frederick Noel remembered “hearing letters from Mr Rickards describing the roughness of the work in those early days ... amid dust and canvas and all the discomforts of such a settlement, but he persevered until he had got a fair-sized temporary church”.

As early as 1872, within a year of the founding of St Cyprian's, Fr Crisp in Bloemfontein reported that “this New Rush Church has a surpliced choir accompanied by a harmonium. The singing is really very good.” Clearly intent upon consolidating a choral tradition here, St Cyprian's soon replaced the harmonium with an organ, purchased from Grahamstown's Commemoration Church in 1874 for the sum of £125.

Rickards promoted the important and neglected cause of education in what would become Kimberley (three schools originated from this work). A Mission School, later called Perseverance, was brought into existence in his day, as were a school for boys and one for girls. St Cyprian's Boys’ School- the original St Cyprian's Grammar School - under headmaster Thomas McLaren was established in March 1876: “For several years this was one of the best schools in Kimberley.”

== St Peter's, Dixton ==
Returning from the Cape Colony, Rickards was curate at St Mary Steps, Exeter (1877-9) and of Llanfair Kilgeddin, Monmouthshire (1883-6) before being appointed to St Peter's Church, Dixton in the Diocese of Llandaff in Wales. There he served as vicar until his death at the age of 77 on 21 June 1921.

In 1915 the parishioners of Dixton voted to not join the Church in Wales when it became disestablished, but stay as part of the Church of England; the parish therefore returned in 1920 to the Diocese of Hereford.
