= George Pullen (priest) =

George Arthur Pullen (died 18 May 1987) was Dean of Kimberley and Rector of St Cyprian's Cathedral, Kimberley, South Africa.

== Previous appointments ==
In 1944, Pullen joined the staff of the cathedral as a deacon, being ordained priest at St Cyprian's later that year.

=== At St Alban’s ===
Pullen was priest-in-charge at St Alban's Church in De Beers, Kimberley, from 1952 to 1963. During this period he was made a Canon and also made Manager of the diocesan Perseverance School in Kimberley, taking charge of St Margaret's Hostel there in 1956. He also served at Floors in the nascent parish of St Barnabas, which had been brought into existence owing to the forced removal of people from the Malay Camp in terms of the apartheid Group Areas Act.

=== Archdeacon of Bechuanaland ===
In 1960, Pullen was appointed Archdeacon of Bechuanaland, an area then including the southern half of modern Botswana, and served in parishes in Vryburg and Mafikeng.

== Dean of Kimberley ==
In 1965, Pullen was invited by Edward Crowther, Bishop of Kimberley and Kuruman (who had been Dean of Kimberley 1964–1965), to become the Dean of Kimberley, and he was installed at St Cyprian's Cathedral on 8 March 1966.

This was a tumultuous time in the history of the church in relation to the tightening grip of apartheid legislation, leading to Crowther's deportation on 30 June 1967. Pullen acted as Vicar General until Philip Wheeldon, re-elected, was re-enthroned in 1968.

A significant project during Pullen's deanship was the commissioning and eventual erection and dedication, by Wheeldon on 15 January 1970, of a statue honouring Henrietta Stockdale. This was situated in the gardens of the cathedral. It was unveiled by three student nurses, one African, one Coloured, and one White. The Mother Superior and members of Community of St Michael and All Angels were in attendance.

== In retirement ==
After serving the Diocese of Kimberley and Kuruman for 32 years, and as an Honorary Canon of St Cyprian's from 1975 until his death, Pullen retired to Cape Town where he was appointed Rector of All Saints, Sonnebloem (formerly a part of District Six). He died in Cape Town.

Anglican Church of Southern Africa titles
Preceded by Edward Crowther	Dean of Kimberley; 1965–1974	Succeeded by Thomas Stanage
