= Charles Maude =

English Anglican priest

Charles Bulmer Maude (29 April 1848 – 11 May 1927) was an Anglican priest in the last third of the nineteenth century and the first third of the twentieth.

Maude was born in Chapel Allerton, Potternewton, Leeds, son of Edmund Maude, of Middleton Lodge, Leeds.

He was educated at Leeds Grammar School and Exeter College, Oxford where he graduated Bachelor of Arts (B.A) in 1871 and Master (M.A.) in 1872.

He was ordained in 1872 by the Bishop of Ripon. After a curacy in Leeds (1872–1875) he served as the third incumbent at St Cyprian's Church, Kimberley, South Africa (1877–1881). After further incumbencies at Wilnecote (1881–1886), Leek (1886–1896; and Shrewsbury (1896–1906) he was Archdeacon of Salop until 1917.

He died on 11 May 1927, aged 79.

== St Cyprian's, Kimberley ==
Maude was one of four priests (the others being Fathers Borton, Balfour and Tobias) brought by Bishop Allan Becher Webb to the Diocese of Bloemfontein in 1876. Maude succeeded Fr Neville Borton as Rector of St Cyprian's Church in Kimberley in 1877, having gone there with Maude upon their arrival from England. He left an account of the still primitive conditions that prevailed in the diamond mining town which was then still less than a decade old. Concerning the rectory, Maude related that: "We have a canvas house for our sitting room and a wooden one for our bedroom. The floors are made of brick dried in the sun, but the legs of beds or tables make holes in them."

"The church floor is of mud and so is very dusty. It is a low building with an iron roof and when it rains we have to give up the service as we cannot be heard! But do not think we are badly off. We have a surpliced choir, 12 boys and 8 men, and a fully choral service. Every Sunday the church is crowded. It holds about 400. I hope we shall soon be able to build one more worthy of the worship of God. At present, too, we are without a school-house and are obliged to have both day and Sunday school in church."

It was during Maude's incumbency that a church building was imported from England to be assembled in Kimberley. The foundation stone was laid in 1879 by Sir Charles Warren. His wife described a calamity which occurred as it neared completion: "Our new church which we were all looking forward to moving into for our Christmas services, and that seemed to be getting on so nicely, was blown over by a whirlwind and is lying a pitiable heap of ruins…it happened one Sunday morning. Our people were having services in the Odd Fellows’ Hall stifling under the heat of an unlined iron building when the crash came. Those who saw it say it was lifted three feet from the ground and dropped, utterly shapeless, like a street of cardhouses! And all our money gone, diamonds are down, and times are bad!" The situation was however salvaged and on Low Sunday 1880 Bishop Webb of Bloemfontein dedicated the "re-erected 'church-like' church" and instituted C.B. Maude as Rector of Kimberley.

Ill health soon forced him to resign, however, and he returned to England.

Maude Street in Kimberley is named after him.

== St Edward's, Leek ==
Maude served subsequently as Vicar of Leek in Staffordshire. The Maude Institute was built and presented for use by St Edward’s Church, Leek by parishioners, as a memento of Maude’s vicariate, in 1896.

== Shrewsbury ==
Maude moved in 1896 from Leek to Shrewsbury in Shropshire when he was appointed by the Bishop of Lichfield both Vicar of St Chad's Church, Shrewsbury and Archdeacon of Salop. During his incumbency at St Chad's the church was fitted with electric light and a new organ, and new parish schools were built. He resigned his incumbency in 1906 because of the weight of his other duty as Archdeacon (responsible for a territory of parishes then covering north east and east Shropshire). He remained Archdeacon, while living at Swan Hill House, Shrewsbury, until retiring in 1917.

He was during that period also Chaplain to the Shrewsbury Borough Corporation for some ten years; Chaplain from 1901 and governor of the Royal Salop Infirmary; Chaplain to the 1st Shropshire and Staffordshire Royal Garrison Artillery Volunteers; Vice-Chairman of the Shrewsbury School Board (abolished 1902) and its successor the Shrewsbury Local Education Authority.

== Personal life ==
Maude married, at Bloemfontein Anglican Cathedral, in January 1878, Geraldine, daughter of Alexander Donovan, of Framfield Place, Sussex, England. The couple had no children, she survived him.

== Retirement and death ==
Following his retirement as Archdeacon, he moved from Shrewsbury to Ludlow, where he lived as tenant in Castle House. Locally he became a governor of both Ludlow Grammar School and Ludlow High School for Girls. He died at home aged 79 after a long illness, and was buried at Shrewsbury General Cemetery on 14 May 1927 after a funeral service in St Laurence's Church, Ludlow.
