= George Pullen =

George Pullen may refer to:

- George Pullen (politician), Australian politician
- George Pullen (priest), South African priest
