= W. F. J. Hanbury =

English Anglican priest (1847–1938)

Rev. William Frederick James Hanbury (10 November 1847 – 19 July 1938) was an Anglican clergyman who was Rector of St Cyprian’s Church, Kimberley on the South African Diamond Fields, 1882–1884.

== Biography ==
Hanbury was born in St Pancras, London, the son of Thomas James Hanbury and Emma Lydia de Witt.

He was educated at St John's College, Cambridge (BA, 1872; MA, 1878). He was ordained deacon in 1873 and priest in 1874. From 1873–75, he was chaplain of the training ship HMS Conway. He was curate at St James' Church, Bicknor, Kent (1875–77) and curate of St Nicholas' Church, Shepperton (1878–82).

Hanbury came to Kimberley South Africa in 1882. It is said that he became worn out by anxiety and overwork and, having been sent to England to recruit workers, he did not return.

Hanbury was assisted in Kimberley by Fr. John T. Darragh, who later established St John's College in Johannesburg.

After returning to England, he was curate of St Mary's Church, Chieveley, Berkshire from 1886–89. From 1889–1923, he was vicar of Church of St Michael and All Angels, Swanmore, on the Isle of Wight. He died at Prince's Mead house, Nettlestone, Isle of Wight, aged 90.
