= George Mervyn Lawson =

The Venerable Fr George Merwyn Lawson (1865–1945) served as archdeacon of Kuruman, 1913–1941, in the Anglican Diocese of Kimberley and Kuruman, and as Director of Missions for Griqualand West from 1903 until his death.

== Early life ==
He was the second son of George Lawson of London, and was educated at Westminster School and King's College, London. He matriculated at Pembroke College, Oxford in 1886, graduating B.A. in 1889.

== Ministry ==
Initially on the staff of St Cyprian's Church in Kimberley, Lawson was in charge of the four ‘location’ missions in that town, based at St Matthew's, Kimberley, around the turn of the twentieth century. At this time he commenced “outlying work” in the rural hinterland, leaving a description of Mass in a “rough hut of sticks”, the altar “a packing case with my portable altar on the top – yet all was reverent as in a cathedral” – “it reminded me of Bethlehem.”

His most distant mission work in 1905 was at Khosis north of Postmasburg. In 1916 Bishop Wilfrid Gore Browne described how Lawson traveled “1040 miles every two months, on horse-back, staying at farms on the way.”

During World War I Lawson served as Chaplain first to the Kalahari Horse in the German South West Africa Campaign and later volunteered for work in Europe.

== Art collector ==
Upon his death Lawson left a collection of 247 original drawings and engravings by French, Dutch, Flemish, English and Italian masters. It includes works by Stefano della Bella, Sebastion Bourdon, Jacques Callot, Simone Cantarini, Annibale Carracci, Sir Anthony van Dyck and Guercino and many others. These Lawson bequeathed to the Kimberley Public Library for the people of Kimberley. In 1991 the collection was transferred to the William Humphreys Art Gallery in Kimberley where it is known as the Lawson Collection. The collection was restored and conservation mounted by the gallery.

== Plant collector ==
Lawson was interested in succulent plants and was encouraged by Archdeacon Frederick A. Rogers to collect specimens. Lawson prepared herbarium specimens and presented plants for identification to Maria Wilman, who was then director of the McGregor Museum in Kimberley. Wilman passed some of Lawson's specimens on to the Bolus Herbarium in Cape Town. The species Ruschia lawsonii (Perdevygie) was named after him by Louisa Bolus.

== Reinterment ==
Archdeacon Lawson's remains were reinterred in the Garden of Remembrance at St Cyprian's Cathedral in Kimberley.
