= Francis Smith (priest) =

South African Anglican priest

Francis William Smith MC was Dean of Kimberley, South Africa, and Rector of St Cyprian's Cathedral in Kimberley.

== Early life ==
In World War I Smith served with distinction as a Second Lieutenant (later Captain) in the 1/8th (Leeds Rifles) Battalion West Yorkshire Regiment. He was awarded a Military Cross, the citation reading thus: "For conspicuous gallantry and devotion to duty. With a few men he dispersed a fighting patrol of the enemy. Later, he assisted to bring in a wounded man under heavy fire. He has at all times set a fine example of courage and determination." Smith wrote poetry, and a collection of his work, entitled "The Great Sacrifice, and other poems" was published by Erskine MacDonald Ltd in 1917.

== St Michael's, Observatory ==
Smith served as the fourth rector at the Parish of St Michael and All Angels in Observatory, Cape Town. His wife had a unique role in St Michael's history: in 1927 an unusually well attended annual vestry meeting was held where the vexed question was to be raised, as to whether ladies were eligible for election to the church council. The motion was then defeated but, three years later, Mary Smith, the wife of the rector, became the first woman member, "since when many have served with great advantage to the parish."

== St Cyprian's Cathedral, Kimberley ==
From Observatory, Smith went to Kimberley as its third dean and eleventh rector of St Cyprian's, being installed at the cathedral on 27 April 1941.

Retiring in 1953, Smith was back in Kimberley on 23 August 1959 to lay the foundation stone of the memorial tower.

Mary Smith was well known in Kimberley for her stage appearances in David Sanders' Boys' High School Players productions, and for her role in the musical life of the city, playing viola in the Kimberley Concert Orchestra under Tommy Marnitz and in an active chamber music group.

Anglican Church of Southern Africa titles
| Preceded by Hugh Scott Chignell | Dean of Kimberley; 1941 –1953 | Succeeded by Arthur Attwell |
