= Clarence Gate Gardens =

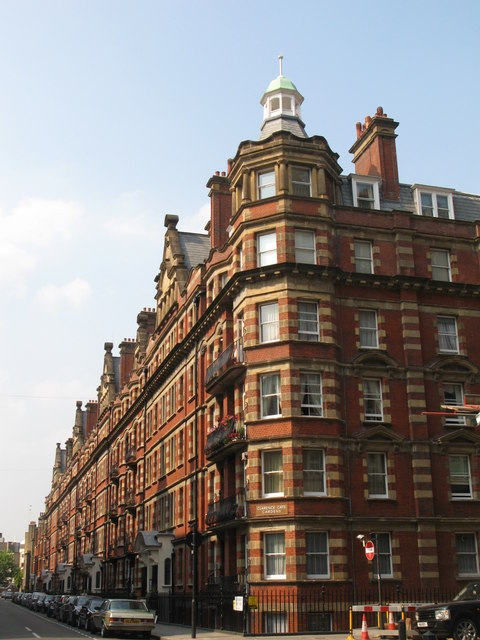
- The eastern elevation of Clarence Gate Gardens, looking north from Melcombe Street

General information
- Location: Marylebone, London
- Address: Glentworth Street, London NW1
- Country: England
- Coordinates: 51°31′25″N 00°09′34″W
- Completed: 1905–1910

Technical details
- Floor count: 7

Clarence Gate Gardens, also known as Clarence Gate Mansions, are Edwardian, Arts and Crafts and Art-Nouveau-inspired mansion blocks next to Regent's Park in Marylebone.

== History ==
The Clarence Gate Mansions were built between 1905 and 1910 to the east of Dorset Square, alongside The Regent's Park's Clarence Gate. In 1978, following consultations by the City of Westminster, they became part of the protected Dorset Square Conservation Area together with the Grade II* listed church St Cyprian’s, the Art Deco tower of Abbey House, the Rudolf Steiner House and Hall, and Francis Holland School on Park Road.

== Architecture ==
Clarence Gate Gardens is a fine example of the Edwardian mansion blocks built in London at the beginning of the twentieth century. The seven storey, red brick apartments with stone dressings show a number of Arts and Crafts and Art Nouveau influences. Large and elaborate Dutch gables contain two additional roof storeys, with paired bay windows rising the full height of the buildings, joined by sinuous Art Nouveau railings. The blocks have segmental porch hoods supported on pairs of ionic columns. The inner doors have fine Art Nouveau handles. On the Glentworth Street elevations, they feature wrought iron Art Nouveau balconies.

== Notable residents ==
Notable current and former residents include:

- T. S. Eliot
- Edgar Wallace
- George Lloyd
- John Cornforth
- Tessie O'Shea
- Kaikhosru Shapurji Sorabji
- Sandi Toksvig
- Charles Clarke
- Gyles Brandreth
- Sir Charles Bracewell-Smith and Lady Nina Bracewell-Smith

== Popular culture ==
In Woody Allen's 2005 film Match Point, the character Nola Rice (Scarlett Johansson) lives at Clarence Gate Gardens.
