= Ipswich Minster =

- Saint Mary-le-Tower church
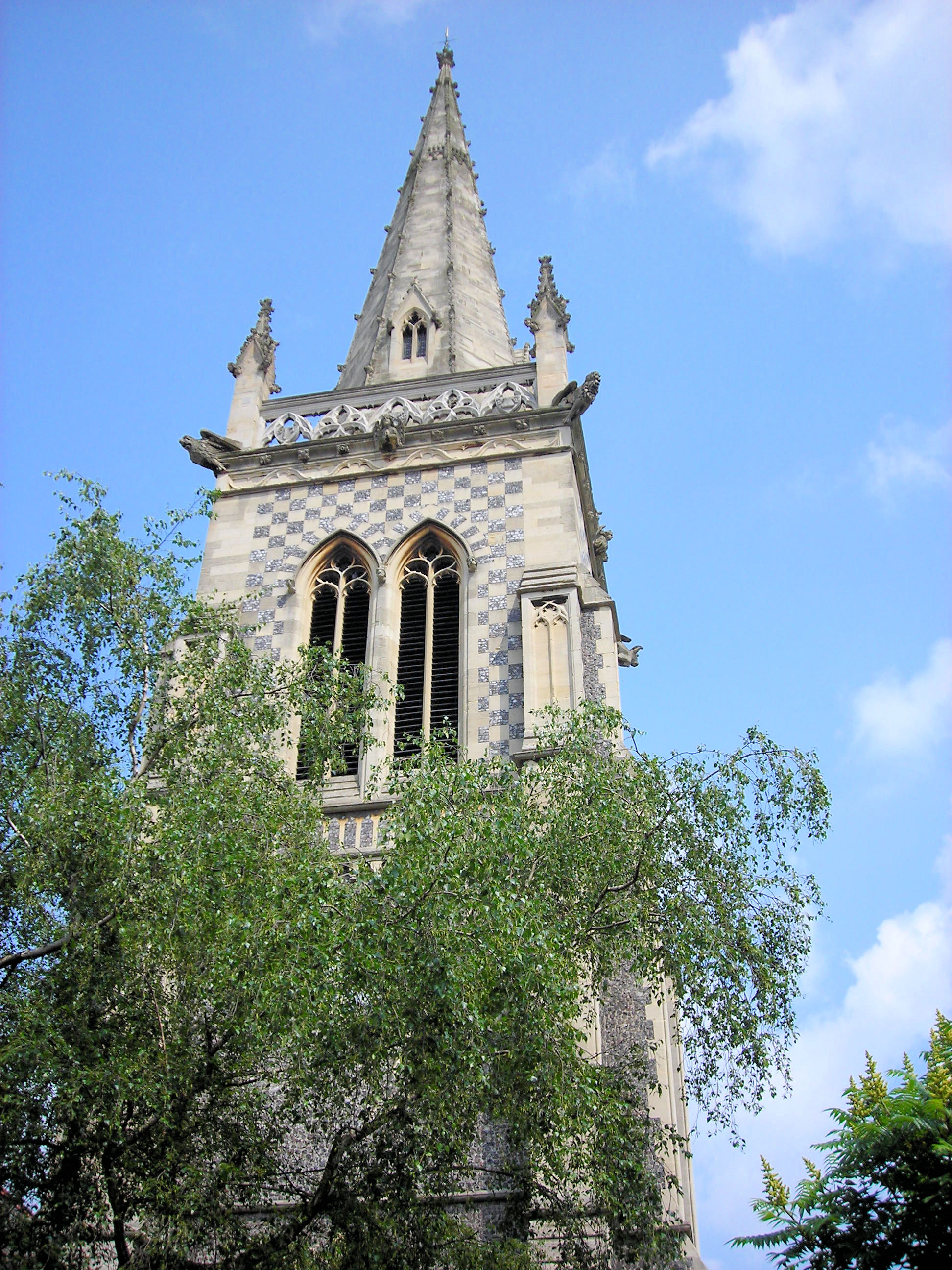
- The tower of the church

- Location in Suffolk
- 52.0584°N 1.1554°E
- OS grid reference: TM 16415 44695
- Location: Ipswich, Suffolk
- Country: England
- Denomination: Church of England
- Churchmanship: Central
- Website: https://www.ipswichminster.org

History
- Dedication: Saint Mary

Architecture
- Heritage designation: Grade II*
- Designated: 19 December 1951

Administration
- Diocese: Diocese of St Edmundsbury and Ipswich

Ipswich Minster, previously known as St Mary-le-Tower, is the civic church of Ipswich, Suffolk, England and a Grade II* listed building. It was in the churchyard of St Mary that the town charter of Ipswich was written in 1200.

== History ==
Although medieval, the church mostly dates from 1860 to 1870, when it was rebuilt by Richard Phipson. Rebuilding was funded by George Bacon, banker and philanthropist. The church, then known as St Mary-le-Tower, is mentioned in the Domesday Book, demonstrating that the site has been occupied by a church since at least 1086.

=== Redesignation as a Minster ===
On 19 January 2025, the church known as St Mary-le-Tower, was redesignated as Ipswich Minster in recognition of its increasingly important role in serving the community of Ipswich.

== Memorials ==
The church contains a memorial brass, on a chancel pier, to H.A. Douglas-Hamilton, vicar from 1915 to 1925. There are also four brasses in the chancel floor.

== Organ ==
The church has a large three-manual pipe organ, which has its origins in an instrument by Renatus Harris of 1690. There was subsequent work by Henry Willis, Spurden Rutt and Bishop & Son. A specification of the organ can be found on the National Pipe Organ Register.

== Bells ==
Originally there were five bells and a Sanctus in 1553 of which Miles Graye I of Colchester recast the Treble in 1607 and the Tenor in 1610. The church was the first in Suffolk to achieve a tower a peal of 12 bells in 1865. With the addition of a sharp second in 1980, the current bells are all by John Taylor & Co, of Loughborough (except for No. 7, which is by Mears & Stainbank of London).

== Incumbents ==
- Thomas Peacock 1542
- John Somerton 1555
- George Webb 1577 - 1606
- Nathaniel Roe 1608 - 1614
- Mr Nuttall 1615
- John Ward 1616 - 1620
- John Gooding 1620 - 1624
- Samuel Ward 1624 - 1627
- Mr Skinner 1628 - 1630
- Mr Raymond 1630 - 1632
- Samuel Ward 1632 - 1635
- John Ashborn 1635 - 1636
- Gawen Nash 1637 - 1641
- William Fincham 1649
- Mr Chapman ???? - 1662
- John Burrough 1662 - 1670
- Hugh Roberts 1670 - 1672
- Samuel Brunning 1674 - 1677
- Samuel Gotty 1677
- Joseph Cutlove 1678 - 1707
- Dr. Thomas Bishop 1708 - 1737
- Thomas Bishop 1737 - 1777
- Thomas Cobbold 1778 - 1831, grandson of Thomas Cobbold (1708–1767)
- Francis Cobbold 1831 - 1838, succeeded his father
- William Nassau St Leger 1838 - 1860
- Joames Robert Thurrock 1861 - 1890
- Afthil Arthur Barrington 1890 - 1904
- William Melville Pigot 1904 - 1914
- Hamilton Anne Douglas-Hamilton 1915 - 1925
- Arthur William Watson Wallace MA 1925 - 1928
- Arthur Herbert Streeten MC MA 1928 - 1942
- Richard Hamilton Babington MA 1942 - 1958
- Basil Layton Spurgin MA 1958 - 1972
- Geoffrey John Tarris MA 1972 - 1982
- Keith Brynmor Jones MA 1982 - 1996
- Peter Kenneth Townley BA. 1996 - 2008
- Charles Alexander Graham Jenkin, BSc 2008 - 2021
- Thomas James Mumford MA 2021 - 2026

== See also ==
- List of tallest buildings and structures in Ipswich
