= Hugh Scott Chignell =

Hugh Scott Chignell (died 19 September 1950) was Dean of Kimberley, South Africa, and Rector of St Cyprian's Cathedral, Kimberley.

== Education and ordination ==
Chignell was a scholar at the Salisbury Cathedral Choir School. Educated further at London University, his degree equipped him for an initial stint as a schoolmaster before he was ordained at St Asaph Cathedral in North Wales.

== South Africa ==
Chignell went out to Johannesburg, South Africa, in 1920.

During four of the following fifteen years he travelled through southern Africa speaking on spiritual healing.

== Kimberley ==
Chignell was installed as Dean of Kimberley at St Cyprian's Cathedral on 3 March 1935, as successor to Thomas Claude Robson. It was "no easy task," John Hunter was to note of Chignell’s career, "to follow so widely loved a man as Dean Robson": but in the six years that he was at St Cyprian’s "he endeared himself to his people." In Chignell’s term in Kimberley much effort was put into the project of completing the cathedral building.

== Projects at St Cyprian’s Cathedral ==
=== Lady Chapel ===
The cathedral's Lady chapel, dedicated to the memory of Robson, was the first of two major projects that materialised at this time. It was made possible by an outpouring of gratitude by "many friends" (as the memorial plaque states) for the life and work of the late Robson. The foundation stone had been laid by Mrs Euston Brown, and the chapel was consecrated by Theodore Sumner Gibson on 24 May 1936. Chignell appealed for further funds to furnish the chapel “according to its merits as a place of worship and beauty.” A pair of Annunciation windows was set above the altar, with further windows dedicated in the 1930s-40s.

=== Cathedral organ ===
The second of two important building projects was the addition of an organ chamber and vestry and the installation of a new three-manual organ. The organ was a gift from Tom Hill of Kimberley as a memorial to his late mother Amy Henrietta Hill. The Hill family had contributed stained glass as well, including the Great Resurrection Windows in the north transept. Chignell hoped the new organ, by J.W. Walker and Sons, would "make us quicker to praise and adore." Sadly, at its dedication on 18 November 1937, the late Hill could be present "only in spirit and not in body to hear the results of his great gift." At the time it was the "only completely electrically operated cathedral organ" in the South Africa: 60 kilometres (40 mi) of wire had been used to make it work. Cathedral organist Wylie Turnbull, at St Cyprian’s from the 1920s, presented a recital after the dedication service, at which the choir had sung the Te Deum.

== Impressions ==
John Hunter would later recall that Chignell was a "deeply spiritual" man, possessed of "profound faith"; and "a man with considerable personal charm."

Anglican Church of Southern Africa titles
Preceded by Thomas Robson	Dean of Kimberley; 1935–1941	Succeeded by Francis Smith
