= Edward Crowther =

Anglican bishop of Kimberley and Kuruman (1929–2021)

Clarence Edward Crowther (known as Edward; 4 March 1929 – 26 June 2021) was the sixth Anglican bishop of Kimberley and Kuruman who on appointment was its youngest bishop.

== Biography ==
Born in Bradford on 4 March 1929 he was educated at the University of Leeds, where he obtained a BA in 1950, LLB in 1952, and LLM in 1953 and at Cuddesdon College for one year (1955/56).

Crowther taught criminal and constitutional law at Exeter College, Oxford, in 1952–55. He was ordained deacon in 1956 and priest the following year, serving as curate at St. Philip and St. James' Church, Oxford, in 1956–58. After a preaching tour in the United States and a period (1959–64) as a college chaplain at the University of California, Los Angeles, he became dean of St Cyprian's Cathedral, Kimberley, in South Africa in September 1964, and then its diocesan bishop in 1965. Crowther was consecrated bishop in Cape Town on 14 November, and he was formally enthroned in St. Cyprian's Cathedral on 29 November 1965. Two years later he was expelled from the country for his opposition to apartheid. In 1970 he returned to California as assistant bishop and obtained a doctorate.

== Works ==
- Where Religion Gets Lost in the Church
- The Face of Apartheid
- Religious Trusts: Their Development, Scope and Meaning
- Care Versus Cure in the Treatment of the Terminally Ill
- Intimacy: Strategies for Successful Relationships

During part of his retirement he lived in France before returning to California.

Anglican Church of Southern Africa titles
Preceded by Kenneth Oram	Dean of Kimberley; 1964 –1965	Succeeded by George Pullen

Anglican Church of Southern Africa titles
Preceded by Philip William Wheeldon; 1st spell	Bishop of Kimberley and Kuruman; 1965 – 1967	Succeeded by Philip William Wheeldon; 2nd spell
