= Leo Theron =

South African stained-glass window artist

Leo Théron
- Born: Johannes Stephanus Theron; 26 March 1926; Pretoria, South Africa
- Died: 2010; Pretoria, South Africa
- Education: Rhodes University; Ecole des Beaux Arts
- Movement: Stained-glass window artist

Johannes Stephanus Theron known professionally as Leo Théron (26 March 1926 – 2010) was a South African stained-glass window artist who specialised in the dalles de verre technique (using glass and concrete).

== Early life ==
Theron was born in Pretoria, the third son of Dutch Reform minister, Johannes Stephanus Theron and his wife, Helena Marais Rossouw.

== Education and career ==
Théron studied art at Rhodes University in South Africa and then at the Ecole des Beaux Arts and Académie Julian in Paris. Returning to South Africa he became involved in designing mosaics and leaded glass windows for new churches. Subsequently he specialized in the technique called dalles de verre sous beton, a method using coloured glass and concrete, developed in France after the second world war, and which he developed as a distinctive style during a return visit to France in 1964, when he studied the work of Gabriel Loire in Chartres, which profoundly informed his approach to the medium.

From his studio in Pretoria, South Africa, Théron spent 35 years creating windows for 137 churches, many educational institutions, civic buildings, and private houses.

In 1978 he was awarded the medal of honour by the South African Academy for Arts and Science.

The major achievement of the dalles de verre technique is the creation of window walls or walls of light, which can occupy entire walls in churches or other buildings, reaching from floor to ceiling.

Théron has spoken of the magic of coloured glass as creating "the prism through which we see into eternity".

== Works ==
In 2000 a retrospective exhibition Leo Théron's work, A Life in Glass, was opened in Sant Fruitós de Bages, some 55 km from Barcelona, Catalonia. It included more than 50 images of stained-glass windows designed and executed by Théron in South Africa, Italy and Spain. The emphasis was on his liturgical art, both figurative and abstract. Portraits in glass expressing the character and personality of saints and historical figures, were shown in prints of windows in southern Africa, as well as an important work - a window depicting Saint Francis - in a Franciscan monastery church near Ponticelli in Italy. Also exhibited were aquarelles of Sant Fruitós de Bages, painted during his visit there in 1996, as well as innovative paintings inspired by his creative work in glass.

Théron's Dove of Peace design was chosen as the symbol of and CD cover for The Millennium Song – a song composed to announce the dawn of the third millennium, released by Michael Greenacre. The Dove of Peace window was installed in the house of Greenacre in Sant Fruitós de Bages.

Windows by Leo Théron are to be seen at:

- St Alban's Cathedral, Pretoria
- St Cyprian's Cathedral, Kimberley (Holy Spirit windows; St Francis; St Clare)
- Moederkerk, Stellenbosch
- St Andrew's Church, Newlands
- St George's College, Harare
- St Mark's Cathedral, George
