= Perseverance School =

- Kimberley, Northern Cape; South Africa

Information
- Former name: St Cyprian’s (E.C.) Mission School (1883-1917)
- Established: 1883; 143 years ago
- Founder: John Rickards
- Enrollment: 657 (1948)

The Perseverance School, Kimberley, was founded as such in 1883 but might be seen as having arisen from the St Cyprian's Mission School dating back to the early 1870s. Until 1917 it was officially called St Cyprian’s (E.C.) Mission School, although known as Perseverance from 1884. For part of its history it was referred to in the plural as Perseverance Schools, after a teacher-training section was established; and latterly the name applied principally to the teacher training college, Perseverance College, in Barkly Road, Kimberley.

== St Cyprian's Mission School ==
The first Rector of St Cyprian's Church, Kimberley, Fr John Witherston Rickards, is credited with starting the St Cyprian's Schools, including a Mission School which was a forerunner to Perseverance. By 1877 two mission schools existed – one at Du Toit's Pan and another at St Cyprian’s. 35 “African” and “Eurafrican” pupils attended the two schools.

== At Clarence street - and the origin of the name ==
The Mission School moved to 'Old St John's Hall' in Clarence Street in 1883. The principal was Mr J. Lean, who was assisted by his wife. The Perseverance Schools '75' anniversary booklet published in 1958 mentions that the institution started with just two teachers and a handful of pupils, although other sources suggest 200 pupils, 70 of whom were communicants. Fr John Darragh, who later founded St John's College in Johannesburg, taught at the Mission School in 1883.

1884 Canon Gaul, the Rector of St Cyprian's, used the name “Perseverance”, determined that the school should not close, as other St Cyprian's schools had. The church meant to “stick to it”. The name stuck, although officially until 1917 the school continued in fact to be the “St Cyprian’s (E.C.) Mission School”.

In 1891 Mr V.G. Teychenné became the principal, serving Perseverance in this capacity until 1924. To generations of students his initials, V.G.T., came to signify “Very Good Teacher”.

At the time of Teychenné’s appointment there were 130 students, rising to 150 in 1906.

== Lawson street ==
The school moved to Lawson street in 1905, moving into purpose-built quarters.

== Perseverance becomes a Diocesan school ==
In 1913 Bishop Wilfrid Gore Browne transferred ownership of Perseverance from St Cyprian's Cathedral to the Diocese of Kimberley and Kuruman.

An important development, in 1920, was the separation of pupil and teacher-training sections, which became known as the Practising School, under Betty Calmeyer, as principal, and the Training School under the continuing headship of Teychenné. The institution came to be known as the Perseverance Schools. Successive heads of the Practising School were Miss Ivy Calmeyer (at the time of whose retirement in 1943 there were 21 staff and 622 pupils on the roll, as well as newly established Nursery School), Mr John David Kester (1943–1948) and Mr M.P. Michaels.

In 1924 Mr Richard Lewis Meadows succeeded Mr Teychenné as principal of the Training School, who in turn was succeeded by Mr F.C. Beedle in 1934. Mr J.D. Kester was appointed head of the Training School in 1948 – when there were 657 children in the Practising School and 100 trainee teachers in Training School.

The Gore Browne Training Institute was established as an offshoot of Perseverance in 1935, before which time many African teachers were trained at Perseverance.

Mr A.H. Ashworth taught music and English and was composer of the school song (with words by Meadows).

Managers of the Perseverance Schools, on behalf of the Diocese, were Canon J.W. Mogg, Fr G.W. Hewitt (from 1942 to 1944), Archdeacon H.E. Wraige (from 1944 to 1953) and Canon George A. Pullen (afterwards Dean of Kimberley).

The Perseverance School Motto is: “Persevere! For honour! For loyalty! For courage! For courtesy! Play up, play fair and play the game!”

In 1958 Perseverance Schools celebrated their 75th anniversary and established the first Monday in May as Founders’ Day.

== Impact of Apartheid ==
Ending his message in the 75th anniversary booklet, Canon Pullen sounds an ominous note when he writes: “What of the future? We may have to move: when, we do not know.” This was in reference to the Apartheid government’s notorious Group Areas Act, which was indeed soon to force Perseverance to move because Lawson Street was in an area designated as "Europeans Only". A new building was erected in Barkly Road, in the area designated for Coloured persons. (At the same time, the Gore Browne Institute which had been built in Barkly Road, was forced to close because it too found itself in the wrong “Group Area”, this time an area designated for Coloureds but not for Blacks. The “Gore Browne (Native) Training School” was disestablished in December 1954.).

The formal link with the Diocese of Kimberley and Kuruman and the Anglican Church was severed, with government taking control of Perseverance.

== Perseverance College in Barkly road ==
Perseverance continued to fulfill its role as a teacher training college through the latter part of the twentieth century.

== Perseverance Building becomes department of education ==
When teacher training colleges were abolished in the post-apartheid era, and Perseverance was absorbed into the National Institute for Higher Education, the Barkly Road building was taken over as the headquarters for the Northern Cape Department of Education.

== The loss of the name ==
In 2012 the Perseverance Building was renamed I.K. Nkoane Education House. A call was made "to protest against this action which destroys a proud legacy" and breaks down "a people's history."

== Legacy ==
- John David Kester, President of the South African Rugby Union (SARU).
- Frances Baard, trade unionist and African National Congress activist.

== Education at St Cyprian's in the 21st century ==
The Anglican Church in Kimberley recommitted itself to education in January 2009 in the (re)opening of St Cyprian's Grammar School, based within the precinct of St Cyprian's Cathedral, Kimberley. As a church school it is a successor to Perseverance which from the start and for most of its existence was intimately connected with St Cyprian's.
