= Arthur Attwell =

British bishop (1920–1991)

- Bishop of Sodor and Man
- Diocese: Diocese of Sodor and Man
- In office: 1983–1988
- Predecessor: Vernon Nicholls
- Successor: Noël Jones
- Other posts: Dean of Kimberley (1953–1960); Archdeacon of Westmorland and Furness &c (1978–1983)

Orders
- Ordination: 1943 (deacon); 1944 (priest) by Kenneth Kirk
- Consecration: 1983 by John Habgood

Personal details
- Born: 5 September 1920
- Died: 2 March 1991 (aged 70)
- Denomination: Anglican
- Residence: Silverdale, Lancashire (at death)
- Parents: Henry John & Kate
- Spouse: Muriel Hesson (m. 1982; wid. 1991)
- Education: Leeds University

Arthur Henry Attwell (5 August 1920 – 2 March 1991) was Bishop of Sodor and Man from 1983 to 1988. He served as Dean of Kimberley, South Africa, from 1953 to 1959 and afterwards as Rector of Workington, Cumberland.

== Family and education ==
Son of Henry John and Kate, Atwell was born in 1920 and attended Wilson School, Reading. He was further educated at Leeds University, gaining a Bachelor of Arts (BA) degree in 1941, before training for the ministry at the College of the Resurrection (Mirfield). He later gained the degrees of Bachelor of Divinity (BD, 1947), Master of Theology (MTh, 1958), and Master of Arts (MA, 1972), all from the University of London; and married Muriel Isobel Hesson in 1982.

== Early ministry in England ==
He was ordained a deacon at Michaelmas (19 September) 1943 and a priest the following Michaelmas (24 September 1944), both times by Kenneth Kirk, Bishop of Oxford, at Christ Church. He served his title (curacy) at St George's, Wolverton, Buckinghamshire (1943–1945) and a second curacy at Wigan, Lancashire (1945–1951).

== South Africa ==
Attwell migrated to South Africa in 1951 to become sub-warden of St Paul's College, Grahamstown, a theological college of the Church of the Province of South Africa. The next year, he was appointed as Dean of Kimberley (Rector of St Cyprian's Cathedral, Kimberley and senior priest of the Diocese of Kimberley and Kuruman) and installed at the cathedral on 28 June 1953. At his appointment, at age 32, he was the youngest cathedral dean in any Anglican church.

This was a period of anguish in South Africa as Apartheid legislation was passed into law and implemented. In 1956 John Boys, Bishop of Kimberley and Kuruman, appointed a commission to investigate the probable effects of the Group Areas Act in Kimberley – which was resulting in forced removals as different ‘race groups’ were separated (not infrequently splitting families) and directed to live in designated suburbs or townships. In 1959 the Diocesan Magazine, Highway, stated with respect to the Group Areas Act that: “We in the Anglican Church declare the act to be evil and to be opposed at every point.”

During Attwell’s term as Dean of Kimberley decisive steps were taken towards completing the building of the Cathedral (begun in 1907). In 1954 materials were ordered for the building of the cathedral tower but it was not before August 1959 — just when Attwell announced his resignation — that work was actually started and the foundation stone laid by his predecessor as dean, Francis Smith

== Return to England ==
Afterwards he returned to England to become Rector at St Michael's, Workington, Cumberland (1960–1972); he was also made an honorary canon of Carlisle Cathedral in 1964, and served as rural dean of Cockermouth and Workington (1966–1970). His widow, Muriel, later gave his considerable theological library, containing some 4000 books, to St Michael’s. He moved in 1972 to become a canon residentiary of the cathedral until 1978, when he became, simultaneously: Archdeacon of Westmorland and Furness; Vicar of St John's, Windermere, Westmorland; the first Director of the diocesan training institute; and an honorary canon of the cathedral again. He sat on the national Church Assembly/General Synod as a Proctor in Convocation (1965–1982) and served David Halsey, Bishop of Carlisle as an examining chaplain (1972–1983).

== Isle of Man ==
Attwell was appointed to the episcopacy in 1983 when he was appointed as Bishop of Sodor and Man (and ex officio a member of Tynwald and Dean of Peel). He was consecrated a bishop by John Habgood, Bishop of Durham, at York Minster on 14 September 1983. At his installation on Man, he pledged himself to serve the island and “to seek to appreciate all that was important in the Manx way of life and to the Manx nation, and would try to master the Manx language.”

In their study of “The work of a religious representative in a democratic legislature,” Edge and Pearce remark that the interventions of Attwell, like those of his predecessor Eric Gordon, “initially sought to explicitly identify philosophical foundations for legislative activity” but that though he had been complimented for his attendance in the legislature, his contributions, compared with those of other bishops, had been “relatively low key.” He was concerned with issues of morality – in particular “the importance of the conventional family” in relation to Civil Registration and Matrimonial legislation, but also with regard to education as “character development rather than simply vocational training”, and in relation to the rising tide of illegal drugs. He also engaged with continuing debates on Sunday trading. He was interested in and contributed to debates concerning culture, including the Manx Museum and archaeological matters.

Attwell was also concerned with overseas development, making inputs to discussion on the Resolution to approve Public Lottery Regulations 1984.

At his departure in 1988, Attwell admitted that he had not found learning Manx an easy task. At a farewell function the Lieutenant-Governor formally thanked him for his work, noting particularly his contribution to debates on “youth, on heart and soul, and on morality in its greatest sense”.

== Retirement ==
He retired to Silverdale, Lancashire in July 1988, and was licensed as an Assistant Bishop in the Diocese of Blackburn; he retained that license, and lived in Silverdale, until his death in 1991.

Anglican Church of Southern Africa titles
Preceded by Francis Smith	Dean of Kimberley; 1953–1959	Succeeded by Kenneth Oram
Church of England titles
Preceded by Vernon Nicholls	Bishop of Sodor and Man; 1983–1988	Succeeded by Noël Jones
