= London Shostakovich Orchestra =

The London Shostakovich Orchestra is an orchestra based in St Cyprian's Church on Glentworth Street in Marylebone, London, England. Founded in November 1999, its conductor is Christopher Cox and the leader is Jonathan Lee. They first performed in May 2000, and have performed over a dozen concerts to date (as of May 2011).

It was named in honour of 20th century Russian composer Dmitri Shostakovich, on whose compositions the orchestra places heavy emphasis. In 2014 they achieved their intention to perform all 15 of Shostakovich's symphonies.

The orchestra is funded by contributions from its members and money received from ticket sales. The London Shostakovich Choir was formed in May 2011 to perform the 2nd Symphony with the Orchestra.
