= Wilfrid Gore Browne =

20th-century Anglican bishop

The Right Reverend Wilfrid Gore Browne
- Bishop of Kimberley and Kuruman
- Church: Anglican
- Province: Southern Africa
- Diocese: Kimberley and Kuruman
- In office: 1912–1928
- Predecessor: First incumbent
- Successor: Theodore Sumner Gibson
- Previous post: Dean of Pretoria

Orders
- Ordination: 1882
- Consecration: 1912

Personal details
- Born: 6 May 1859 Auckland, New Zealand
- Died: 15 March 1928 (aged 68) Kimberley

Wilfrid Gore Browne (Note: This is the correct spelling of his name, as indicated inter alia on his tomb stone, West End Cemetery, Kimberley – buried 16 March 1928; as well as in his Church Times obituary) (6 May 1859 – 15 March 1928) was an Anglican bishop, the first Bishop of Kimberley and Kuruman from 1912 to 1928. He was described as a saintly bishop with "a keen sense of humour" and "a winning courtesy."

== Early life and education ==
Gore Browne was born in Auckland, New Zealand, the youngest of the family of Col Sir Thomas Gore Browne. He spent his early years in New Zealand where his father was Governor. He was educated, with his brother Frank Gore Browne, K.C., at Harrow School (from 1873) and at Trinity College, Cambridge where he took his degree in 1881. Before his ordination Gore Browne enlisted with the 11th Hussars for six months "with the object of getting experience which would help him in his work among men." Wilfrid Gore Browne was the uncle of Stewart Gore-Browne, the founder of Shiwa Ngandu in Zambia.

== Ordination to priesthood and work in Darlington and Pretoria ==
Ordained deacon in the Diocese of Durham in 1882, priest in 1883, his first post was as curate at Pallion, 1882–3. He served subsequently at St Hilda, South Shields, 1883–7; St John the Evangelist, Darlington, 1887–9; and as perpetual curate/priest in charge of St Hilda's Church, Darlington, 1889–1902; before a posting to South Africa which he took on account of serious lung trouble.

A correspondent describing his pioneer work at St Hilda's mission in a slum district of Darlington wrote of "a sheer spiritual romance, full of interest, delight and humour. The vicar's enthusiastic joy in the life of the Church was amazingly infectious. On one Easter Day, coming down to the chancel steps to preach at the Eucharist, he gave out his text, 'The Lord is risen indeed!' and after a moment's silence, said, with a smile that was all but a laugh, 'It's no use, dear people; I can't say anything more,' and returned to the altar."

"Endless instances might be given," the correspondent added, "of his sympathy with suffering and his efforts to restore those who were down and out. The writer remembers finding a dying child in a filthy bed in a slum, playing with the gold watch and chain which he had left for its amusement. Guests at the clergy house were liable at any time to sit down to high tea between an earl and a thief fresh from prison."

Gore Browne was described at this time as "a thorough Catholic and a true Evangelical." His church of St Hilda's was, apart from the mother parish of St John's, the only church in Darlington then where Catholic ceremonial was in use and all sacramental privileges provided. "There was never any local opposition; but emissaries from Protestant societies occasionally came to point out the connexion between vestments and the Vatican. A Kensit lecturer on one occasion was rash enough to invite anyone in the audience to speak in answer to his statements. The invitation was promptly accepted by a hulking mechanic from the N.E. Railway shops. Climbing onto the platform he surveyed the lecturer for a moment in dead silence. Then, turning to the audience with a grin on his grimy face, he said very deliberately: 'The jintleman ... is ... not ... fit ... to ... black ... Gore Browne's ... boots!' ending the meeting – and the Protestant campaign – in tumultuous applause."

In South Africa, as rector of Pretoria, 1902–1909, then dean of Pretoria he was instrumental, as he had been in England, in setting up fledgling churches.

== Bishop of Kimberley and Kuruman ==
Promotion to the episcopate came in 1912 following his election as the first bishop of Kimberley and Kuruman, a vast, newly established diocese, 305,000 square miles (790,000 km^{2}) in extent, carved out of the existing Diocese of Bloemfontein, with a portion from the Diocese of Cape Town, and half of Bechuanaland Protectorate which had until then been administered as part of the Diocese of Mashonaland (Southern Rhodesia). He was consecrated at Bloemfontein Cathedral on 29 June 1912. "The brilliant copes and mitres of the consecrating bishops, the banners, crosses, pastoral staffs, the music of trumpet and organ, gave a glorious feeling of preparation for warfare. It was the Church Militant in South Africa gathered around a new commander, to invest him with its authority, to equip him for his command." He was enthroned at St Cyprian's Cathedral in Kimberley in a similarly impressive service the following day, 30 June 1912. Soon the work organising the new diocese was presenting immense difficulties. His dean, T.C. Robson was away ill, leaving the cathedral in his hands. "Native work" needed to be developed but there were no funds. With the outbreak of war in 1914 the Kimberley mines were shut down, causing huge loss of jobs; further afield in the diocese "droughts seemed almost continuous" and "poverty irremediable."

Gore Browne raised funds for the Diocese on return visits to England. He was also able to recruit new clergy who numbered only 22 in 1912. In 1916 there were ten "native" clergy and more than this number by the end of the 1920s. "To train natives for the ministry seemed to the bishop ... to be the most necessary work of the diocese." Gore Browne also opened new parishes and districts and saw to the building new churches such as at Batlharos.

During sixteen years in Kimberley and Kuruman Bishop Gore Browne is recorded as having visited and ministered in every part of his far-flung diocese (which has since shrunk, no longer including the enormous area which is now the southern half of Botswana). "He spared himself nothing on his long treks," the Church Times obituary notes, "often having to walk for hours through deep sand when his motor stuck." There were parts that could be reached only by ox wagon. Gore Browne is well known for the special ministry he developed to the migrant workers and convicts on the mines in Kimberley, amongst whom he was "trusted and greatly loved and respected".

Bishop Wilfrid Gore Browne died unexpectedly following emergency surgery at Kimberley Hospital on 15 March 1928.

== Miss Gore Browne ==
Gore Browne was assisted in many ways by his sister, Miss Mabyl Gore Browne, who lived with him at Darlington, Pretoria and Kimberley. She died in Kimberley in May 1926. According to one source, Mabyl was instrumental in the establishment of Bishop's Hostel for Anglican boys attending schools in Kimberley.

== Concerns with education and teacher training ==
The 1913 Synod resolved to transfer the Perseverance School from St Cyprian's to the diocese. In order to present more than mere schooling the diocese had the government Education Department officially recognise Perseverance, in 1917, as a teacher training centre. In the following year 430 children and 92 student teachers were enrolled.

Perseverance had originated as one of a number of educational initiatives of the 1870s at St Cyprian's Parish on the Diamond Fields. A St Cyprian's Grammar School (recently re-established) and St Michael's School for girls had not been able to compete with government schools once they were brought into existence, and it was against this background that the Bishop's Hostel for Anglican boys attending other schools in Kimberley (see above) was established in January 1915, the Bishop himself as its first warden.

A memorial to Bishop Wilfrid Gore Browne was the establishment of the Gore Browne (Native) Training School, several years in the making, and opened officially on 29 October 1938. "Gore Browne", as it was known, was disestablished in 1954 and closed as a result of Bantu Education and Group Areas legislation under Apartheid.

== Gore Browne's watercolours ==
Bishop Wilfrid Gore Browne was an accomplished watercolourist who left a sizeable collection of painted studies (and sketches) of Africans with whom he met or engaged in the Kimberley mine compounds and during his travels around his vast diocese. Hailed as being of importance as ethnographic record by A.J.H. Goodwin, they depart from stereotype and, unusually for the era, sensitively depict real individual and often named personalities from the margins of South African society. The collection is preserved at the McGregor Museum in Kimberley, and was show-cased in a patronal festival exhibition at the cathedral under Dean Thomas Stanage in 1976 and in an exhibition opened by Dean Brian Beck of St Cyprian's at the William Humphreys Art Gallery in 2003.
