= H. A. Douglas-Hamilton =

Rector and Honorary Canon

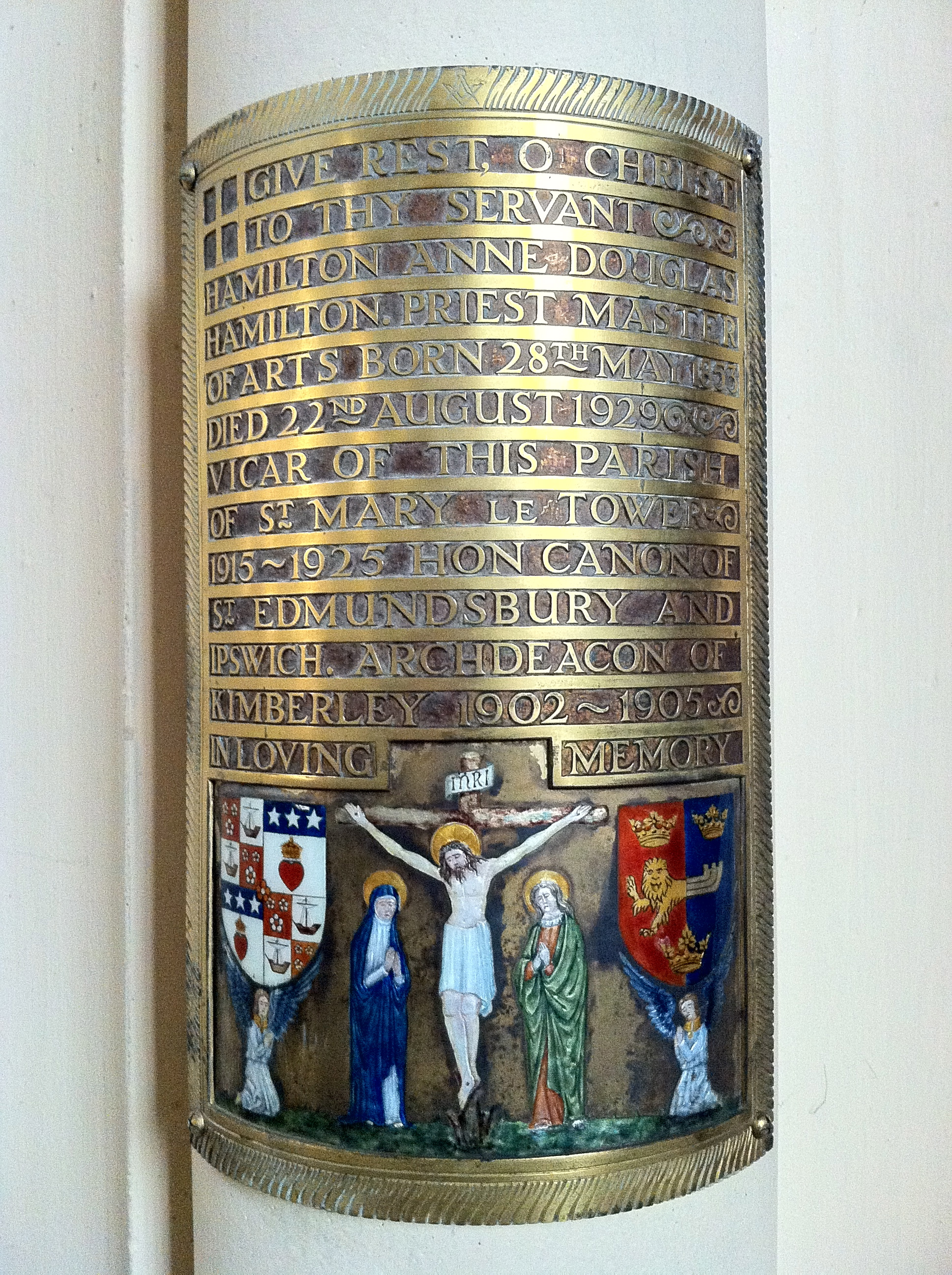
Memorial to Hamilton Anne Douglas-Hamilton in St Mary le Tower, Ipswich

Hamilton Anne Douglas-Hamilton (28 May 1853 – 22 August 1929) was Rector at Marlesford, Suffolk and held the office of Honorary Canon of Bury St. Edmunds Cathedral. He was Honorary Chaplain to the Bishop of St. Edmundsbury, and served in South Africa as Archdeacon of Kimberley and the first Rector of Christ Church Arcadia, in Pretoria. He played first-class cricket when he was a student at the University of Cambridge. He died in Marlesford.

== Early life ==
Born on 28 May 1853 in Simla, Punjab, the son of Maj.-Gen. Octavius Douglas-Hamilton and Katherine Augusta Westenra Macleod, Douglas-Hamilton graduated with an M.A. from Trinity College, Cambridge. Douglas-Hamilton was older brother to Lt. Col. Angus Douglas-Hamilton, a recipient of a posthumous VC during the Great War.

== Positions held ==
The Revd H. A. Douglas Hamilton was appointed Rector of Latimer, Chesham and chaplain to Lord Chesham before becoming Vicar of Holy Trinity Church in 1891. In 1898, he was appointed rector of Old Charlton, Rochester. From 1915 to 1925 he was Vicar of St Mary le Tower, Ipswich.

In South Africa Douglas-Hamilton was Archdeacon of Kimberley and Rector of St Cyprian’s Church from 1903 to 1905, after which he went to Pretoria as first Rector of Christchurch Arcadia.

== Family ==
Douglas-Hamilton married, firstly, Lillie Bowles, daughter of J. Bowles, on 26 October 1875. They had issue:

- Captain Basil Sholto Anne Douglas-Hamilton b. 11 Aug 1876, d. 12 Apr 1920
- Commander James Angus Douglas-Hamilton b. 13 Aug 1890
- Ilta Douglas-Hamilton b. b 1900, d. 10 Mar 1957
- Mary Douglas-Hamilton b. b 1900.

Douglas-Hamilton married, secondly, Hon. Agnes Rosamund Bateman-Hanbury, daughter of William Bateman-Hanbury, 2nd Baron Bateman of Shobdon and Agnes Burrell Kerrison, on 24 October 1922. He died on 22 August 1929 at age 76.

== Cricket ==
While he was studying at the University of Cambridge, he was called Hamilton Hamilton. He played for Cambridge University Cricket Club 1873–75, and for the Gentlemen of England, in a total of 15 first-class matches. He was a right-handed batsman and a wicketkeeper who sometimes bowled with a right-arm fast roundarm action. He scored 204 career runs with a highest score of 37; he held 12 catches and completed seven stumpings; and he took eight wickets with a best return of four for 80.
