= St Cyprian's, Clarence Gate =

Church in London, England

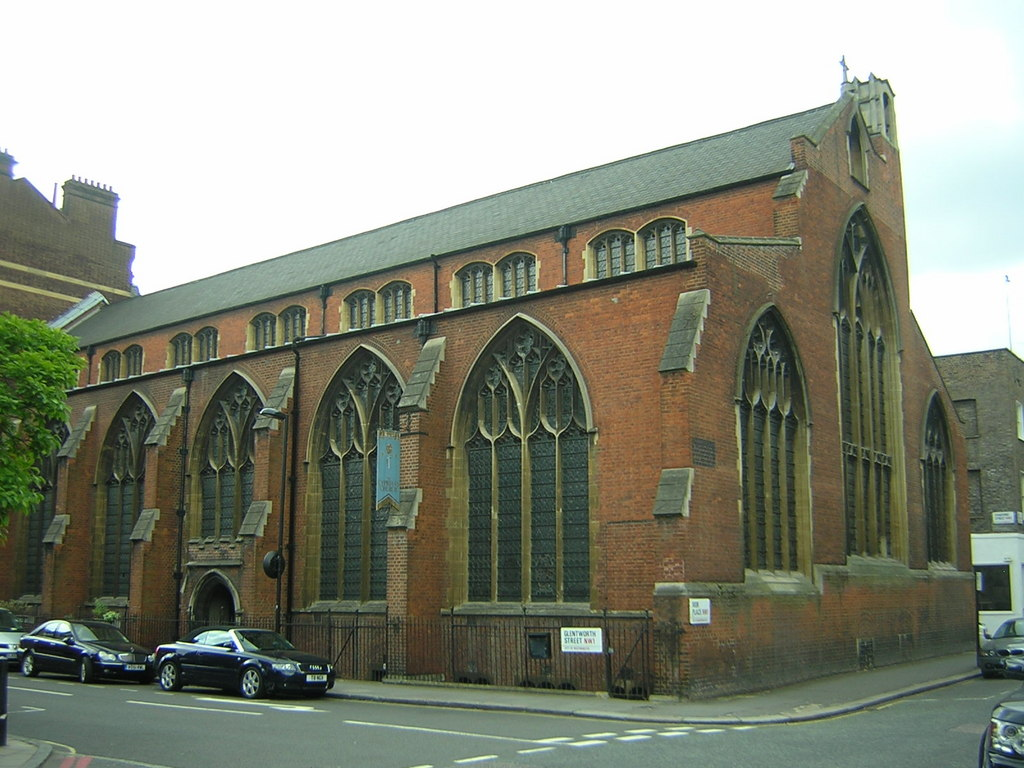
- St Cyprian's church from the north east

- Location in the City of Westminster
- 51°31′28″N 00°09′36″W
- OS grid reference: TQ 27750 82209
- Location: Glentworth Street, Regent's Park, London NW1 6AX
- Country: England
- Denomination: Church of England
- Churchmanship: Anglo-Catholic
- Website: stcyprians.org.uk

Architecture
- Heritage designation: Grade II* listed
- Architect: Ninian Comper
- Style: Gothic Revival
- Years built: 1901–03

Administration
- Diocese: Diocese of London
- Archdeaconry: Charing Cross
- Deanery: Westminster Marylebone
- Parish: St Cyprian, Marylebone

Clergy
- Vicar: The Revd Clare Dowding
- Priest: Revd Kristina Andréasson

St Cyprian's Church is a parish church of the Church of England in the Marylebone district of London. The church was consecrated in 1903, but the parish was founded in 1866.

It is dedicated to Cyprian, a third-century martyr and bishop of Carthage and is near the Clarence Gate Gardens entrance to Regent's Park, off Baker Street. The present church was designed by Ninian Comper and is a Grade II* listed building.

== The first St Cyprian's; a mission chapel ==
The parish was formed by the efforts of 'slum priest' Charles Gutch, who after curacies at St Matthias', Stoke Newington, St Paul's, Knightsbridge, and All Saints, Margaret Street wanted a church of his own. Gutch's campaigning Anglo Catholic views and pastoral mission to London's poor led him to propose a mission church in the then slum enclave northeastern corner of Marylebone. This required a portion of the parishes of St Marylebone and St Paul, Rossmore Road to be handed over. However, neither the Rector of St Marylebone nor the Vicar of St Paul's approved of the Anglo Catholic churchmanship and pastoral stance of Gutch.

Gutch eventually negotiated one tenth of St Paul's parish be transferred to a new mission district where church attendance was in any case poor and which was then densely populated due to the overcrowded slums. Gutch proposed to dedicate the mission chapel to St Cyprian of Carthage, explaining:

"I was especially struck by his tender loving care for his people, the considerateness with which he treated them... And I said, 'If only I can copy him, and in my poor way do as he did, I too may be able to keep my little flock in the right path, the road which leads to God and Heaven'."

Designed by the celebrated church architect George Edmund Street, St Cyprian's Mission Chapel was a low-budget conversion of a terraced house and a mews hay barn, unlike Street's typical grander designs. The first Eucharist was celebrated on 29 March 1866. A contemporary description refers to the “little church" as "a quaint building consisting of the front rooms of a house in Park Street, with the yard behind them and the stable in the mews at the back, the upper storey of which formed the choir, the stable itself the vestry. Underneath it the yard, which had been a coal store, was roofed over and had a skylight, and a flight of many steps led up to the sanctuary. A surpliced choir was an unusual sight in the ‘60s, except in cathedrals and special advanced churches, and the daily celebration, which was carried on in this little sanctuary for 36 years, was something still more strange. About 150 people could be squeezed in, when all the gangways were filled up, and the services were very hearty and the congregation regular and devoted”.

Over the next thirty years St Cyprian Mission Chapel flourished, but holding only 180, multiple Sunday services were needed to accommodate demand. Ground landlord 1st Viscount Portman refused a site for a larger replacement, as he did not like Gutch's churchmanship and when Gutch died in 1896, his vision of a permanent church was unrealised.

== The present church ==
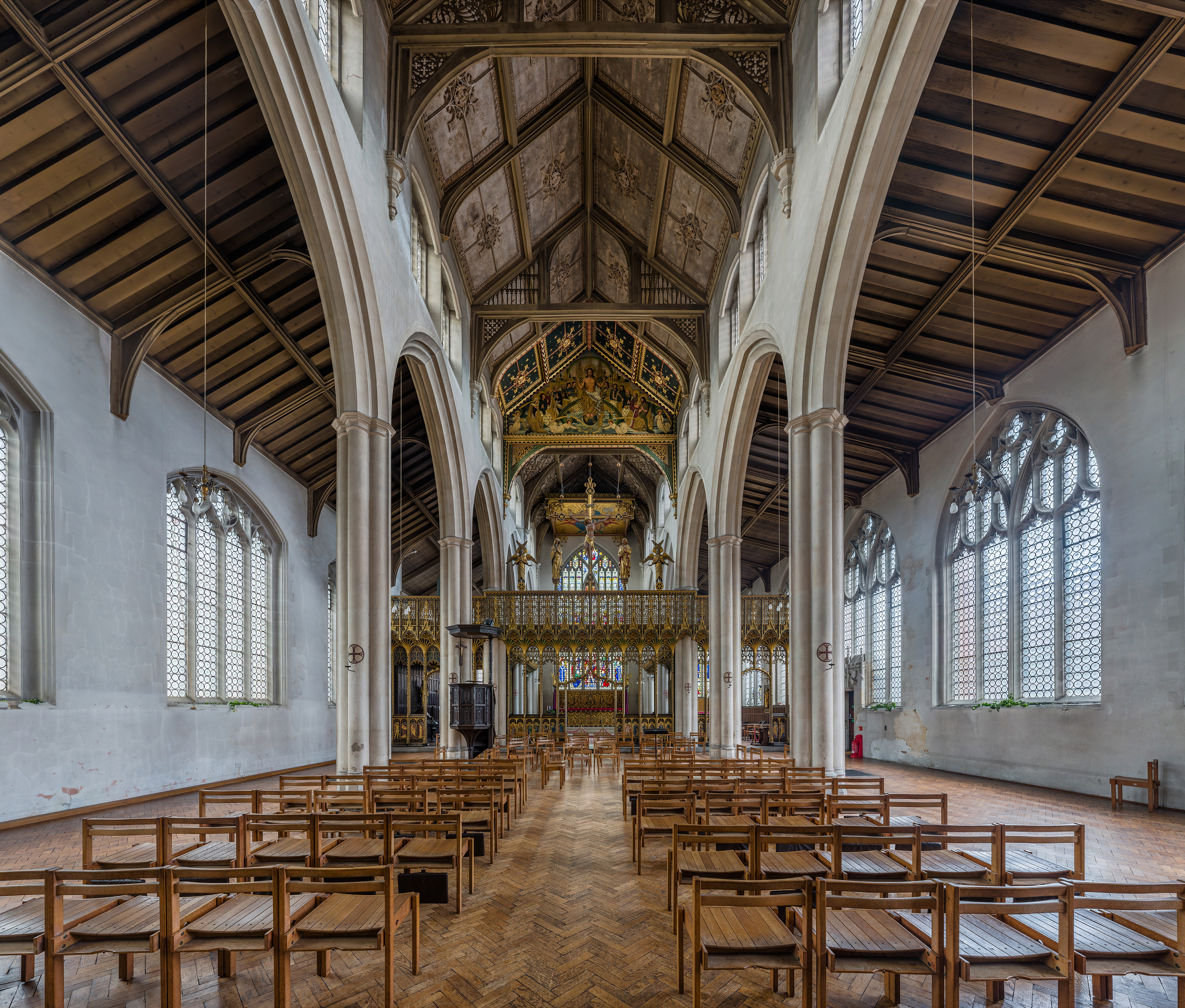
The nave, looking East

Bishop Mandell Creighton, appointed the Reverend George Forbes as Gutch's successor. Forbes argued for a new permanent church and in 1901 the 2nd Lord Portman agreed to sell a site for £1000, conditional on it being demonstrated that sufficient funds were raised to consecrate the church by 1 June 1904. The new St Cyprian's was completed with almost a year to spare, and was dedicated to the Glory of God and the memory of Charles Gutch by the new Bishop of London, Arthur Winnington-Ingram. The sale coincided with the clearance of run-down houses in Park Street – today Glentworth Street – when the arrival of the Great Central Railway terminus at Marylebone station and its adjacent fashionable hotel was altering the desirability of the neighbourhood. Lord Portman developed middle class 'mansion flats' next to the new church.

When consecrated in 1904 the church interior was sparsely decorated for lack of funds. Although the altars were complete, completion of interior decoration and fittings continued as gifts and legacies came in. Parclose screens were added and the stone font, vaulted narthex and gallery above in 1930. The decoration of the screens progressed in stages and the tester above the high altar installed in 1948. West doors followed as late as 1952. At present the organ's decorative case in the west gallery still remains incomplete, as do minor elements of carved stone ornament.

On 7 October 1940, German incendiary bombs burned South aisle roof lead and timbers. Some of the burning material fell to the church floor but it was rapidly extinguished; an area of scorched wooden floor has been left in testament.

== Architecture ==
The present church was designed by Ninian Comper (1864–1960) in a Perpendicular Gothic style. Commissioned in 1899, it was constructed between 1901 and 1903, the first new church completed to Comper's designs (his previous work comprised restoration and embellishment of existing buildings).

St Cyprian's is of red brick with stone dressings and has a nave with clerestory and two aisles. There is no tower, but a small bellcote on Chagford Street. The architect's model for the design was the 'wool churches' of East Anglia, as championed at the time as a model for Anglo-Catholics by the Alcuin Club. It features large Perpendicular windows but the stained glass, also designed by Comper, is confined to the east end. The nave is modelled on the parish church of Attleborough in Norfolk.

St Cyprian's was designed to reflect Comper's emphasis on the Eucharist and the influence on him of the Oxford Movement; he said his church was to resemble "a lantern, and the altar is the flame within it". Therefore, the interior features unadorned whitened walls in the nave, to emphasise the contrasting richness of painted and gilded furnishings in the sanctuary. The sanctuary fittings include a delicate carved and painted rood screen and parclose screens around an 'English Altar' i.e. altar surrounded on three sides by hangings and a painted dossal, riddel posts with angels and a painted and gilded reredos; this was the kind of altar that the Alcuin Club favoured and Comper used in his early churches. At St Cyprian's the altar is set beneath a tester placed high up in the roof. Above the rood screen is a suspended rood.

The timber roof features combined hammer beam – tie-beam trusses with panelled tracery spandrels. Comper's stated aim was "to fulfil the ideal of the English Parish Church ... in the last manner of English Architecture". A stone font with gilded classical font cover dating from the 1930s greets the visitor at the West end, and demonstrates Comper's enjoyment, later in his career, of putting classical beside gothic features, a design strategy he called 'Unity by Inclusion.'

== Iconography ==
In line with the deliberate emphasis on a plain nave leading to a richly embellished sanctuary, the iconography of the sanctuary is carefully considered. The fact that it was closely supervised throughout by the same architect, working with his preferred and trusted artisans and craftsman enabled a coherent scheme, in spite of the fact that its completion continued over five decades. The three screens separating the nave and aisles from the sanctuary and chapels are embellished in the lower stage arcade with fine paintings, mostly of saints, the subjects named below each painting.

The left-hand screen leads to what was originally called the All Souls' Chapel and the screen shows Michael the Archangel (weighing souls), Noah, Abraham (holding souls) and Job on the inside; the outside of the screen has Moses, David and Daniel. On completion of this screen's decoration, the chapel was re-dedicated as the Chapel of the Holy Name.

The right-hand screen, separating the liturgical South aisle from the Lady Chapel comprises female saints: St Anne, St Mary Magdalene, Mary of Clopas, St Mary, the mother of James, Salome, St Agnes, St Cecilia, St Catherine of Alexandria, St Margaret of Antioch, St Margaret of Scotland, St Ursula, St Elizabeth of Hungary, and St Joan of Arc.

The central screen below the rood and its attendant narrow choir gallery was completed in stages up to 1938 and the figures in the bottom stage, also all named, are: St Mary Magdalen, St John the Baptist, St John the Evangelist, St Andrew, St Peter, St Michael, St Gabriel, St Mary the Virgin, St George, St Paul, St James the Great, St James the Less, St Clement, and St Faith.

== Windows and fittings ==
Windows

The central window over the altar The Lady Chapel window shows the Annunciation of the Angel to Mary, flanked by St Margaret of Scotland and St Æthelthryth.

Tester

The gilded square tester suspended high over the high altar was completed in 1948. Surrounded by prayers and sacred monograms the central figure shows Christ holding an open book. The inscription, in Greek, reads "I am the Light of the World".

Font cover

The gilded classical font cover, dating from the 1930s, greets the visitor at the West end, and demonstrates Comper's enjoyment, later in his career, of putting classical beside gothic features, a design strategy he called 'Unity by Inclusion.'

== Reception ==
St Cyprian's is regarded as one of London's most beautiful church interiors.

Writing a year after its consecration, and in spite of the still incomplete decoration of the interior, T. Francis Bumpus wrote "Mr. Comper's researches into the history of our old English Uses have enabled him ... to produce one of the most beautiful, harmonious and correctly arranged churches that has been built in London for a long time." Peter Anson held that "It was the opening of St Cyprian's ... that finally established the reputation of the architect... There were no fixed seats only chairs, which during the week were removed, so that most of the polished parquet flooring was left bare. Nobody had ever seen anything like St Cyprians." (The practice of removing chairs was continued until the 1950s.)

Later, after most of the interior fittings were complete, John Betjeman persuaded the proprietor and editor of the Architectural Review to visit in 1938. The owner was at the time a leading advocate of Modernism in architecture but wrote to Betjeman "To our surprise — to our inexpressible surprise — we discovered it was absolutely lovely. ... indubitably the work of an architect with a remarkable feeling of space and clarity of planning...I confess I was much astonished ... You have scored again, brother." In 1947, Betjeman was still championing Comper's work and wrote to Arthur Bryant "When in London do make a special journey to Comper's superb church (1899) of St Cyprian's, Baker Street. It is a red building near Clarence Gate, Regent's Park ... not much outside, but a Norfolk dream of gold and light within." On a later visit to the church with Simon Jenkins, Betjeman exclaimed "Ah Norfolk, Norfolk in Baker Street!".

Architectural journalist Ian Nairn was another advocate for St Cyprian's: "Quiet and reserved outside; but the most joyful church interior in London. Tall white arcades, clear glass to let the light stream in across the polished wood floor, uncluttered by pews to Comper's lacy gilded rood screen. Religion singing and dancing ...". Elsewhere he described the church as "a sunburst of white and gold and all-embracing love… the moment you go in through the door you know that everything is absolutely right". Nairn called the church Comper's "soaring lark-cry".

Nikolaus Pevsner saw late Gothic-revival architecture as old-fashioned and generally gave it little credit; but he praised Comper's work at St Cyprian's, albeit a little grudgingly: "If there must be medieval imitation in the twentieth century, it is here unquestionably done with joy and care." Comper was hailed in the mid twentieth century by Peter Hammond, a key advocate of the liturgical movement in architecture who favoured modernist architecture. Hammond praised Comper's liturgical emphasis on the altar and (secondarily) font, seeing that Comper had "realised that the real questions at issue were theological and liturgical rather than stylistic and aesthetic".

Anthony Symondson wrote that St Cyprian's established Comper's "primacy as the most influential English church architect of his generation. A simple red brick exterior gives no impression of the beauty and surprise of the interior. It is a fusion of controlled austerity and splendour."

The interior

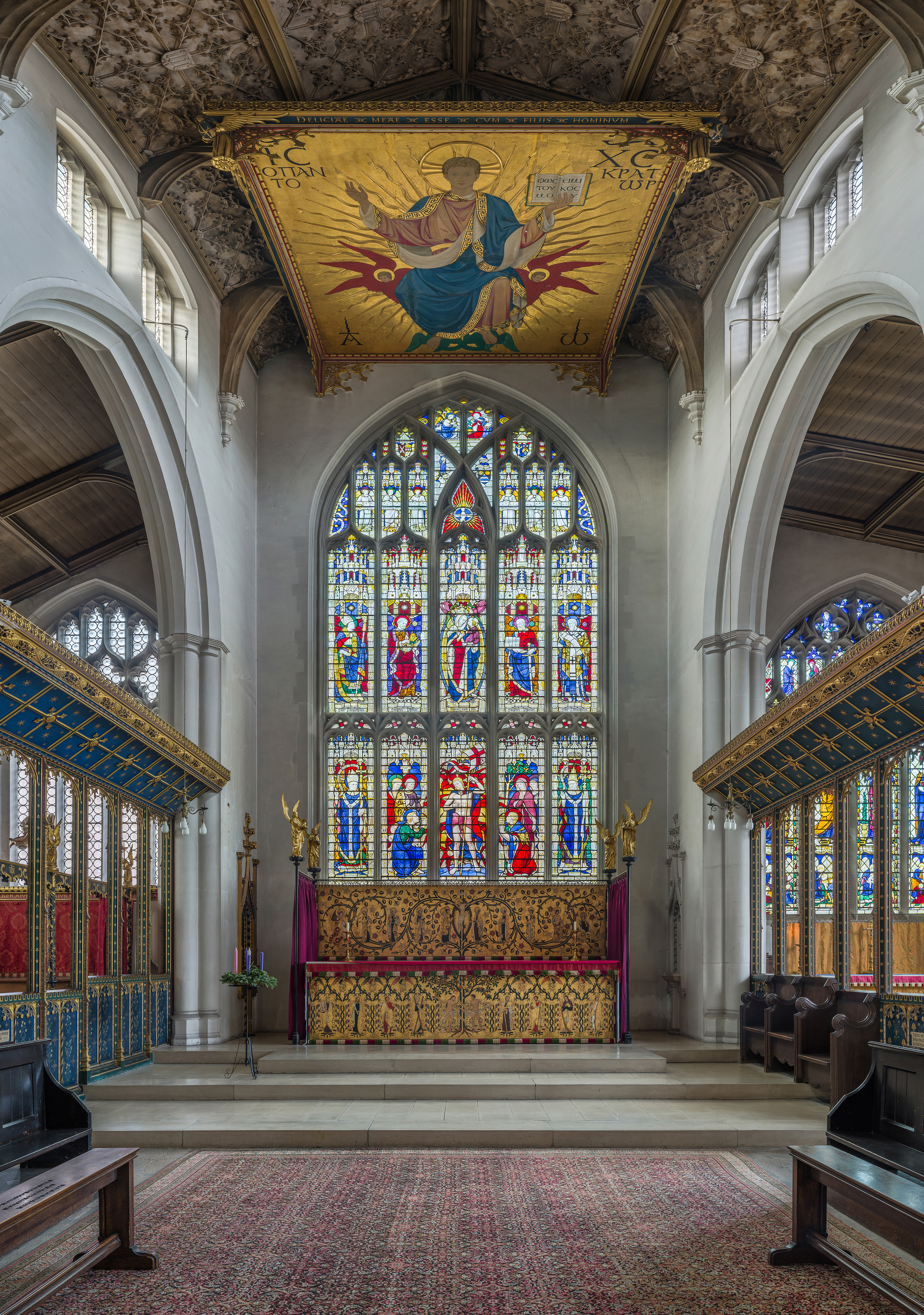
The sanctuary

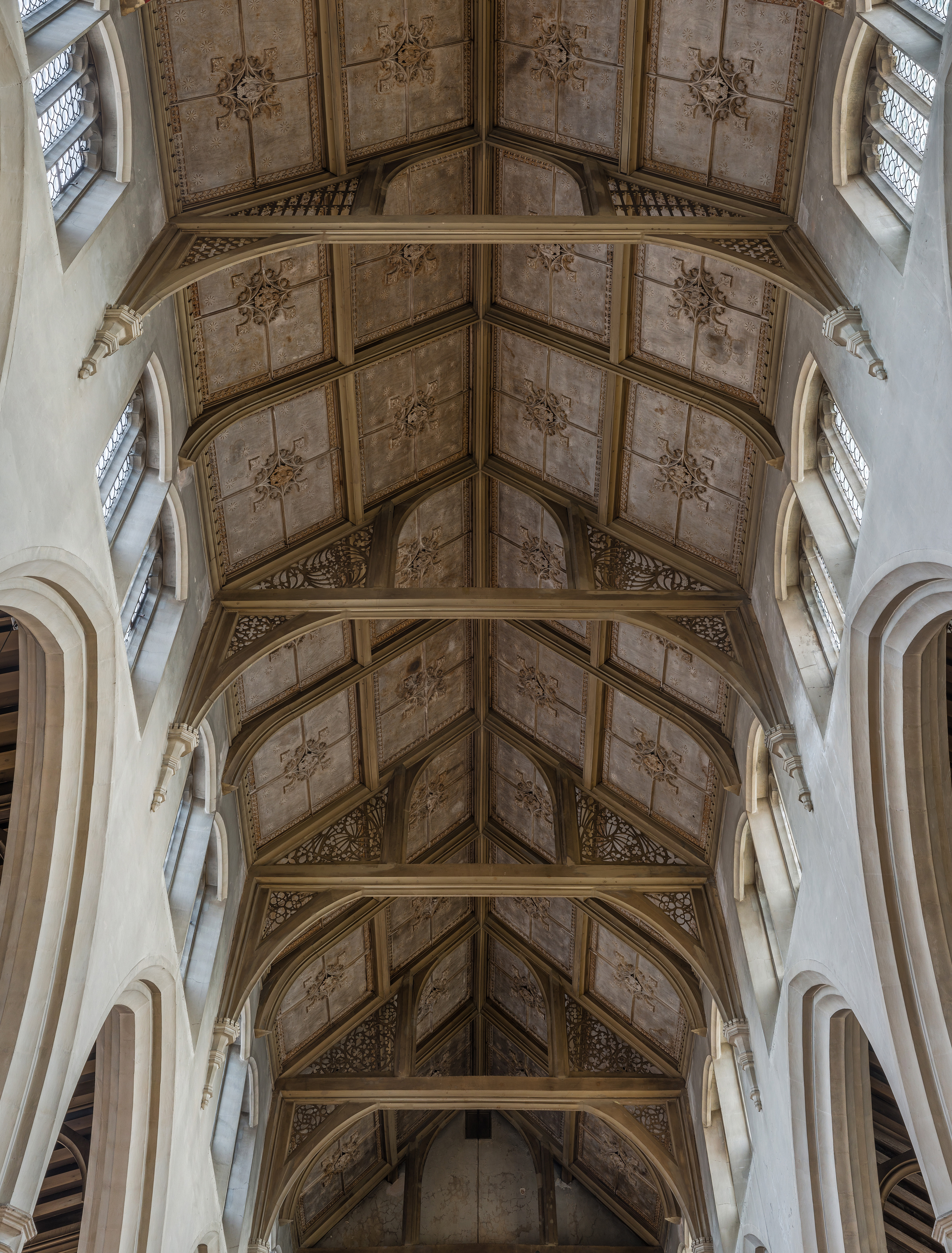
The ceiling

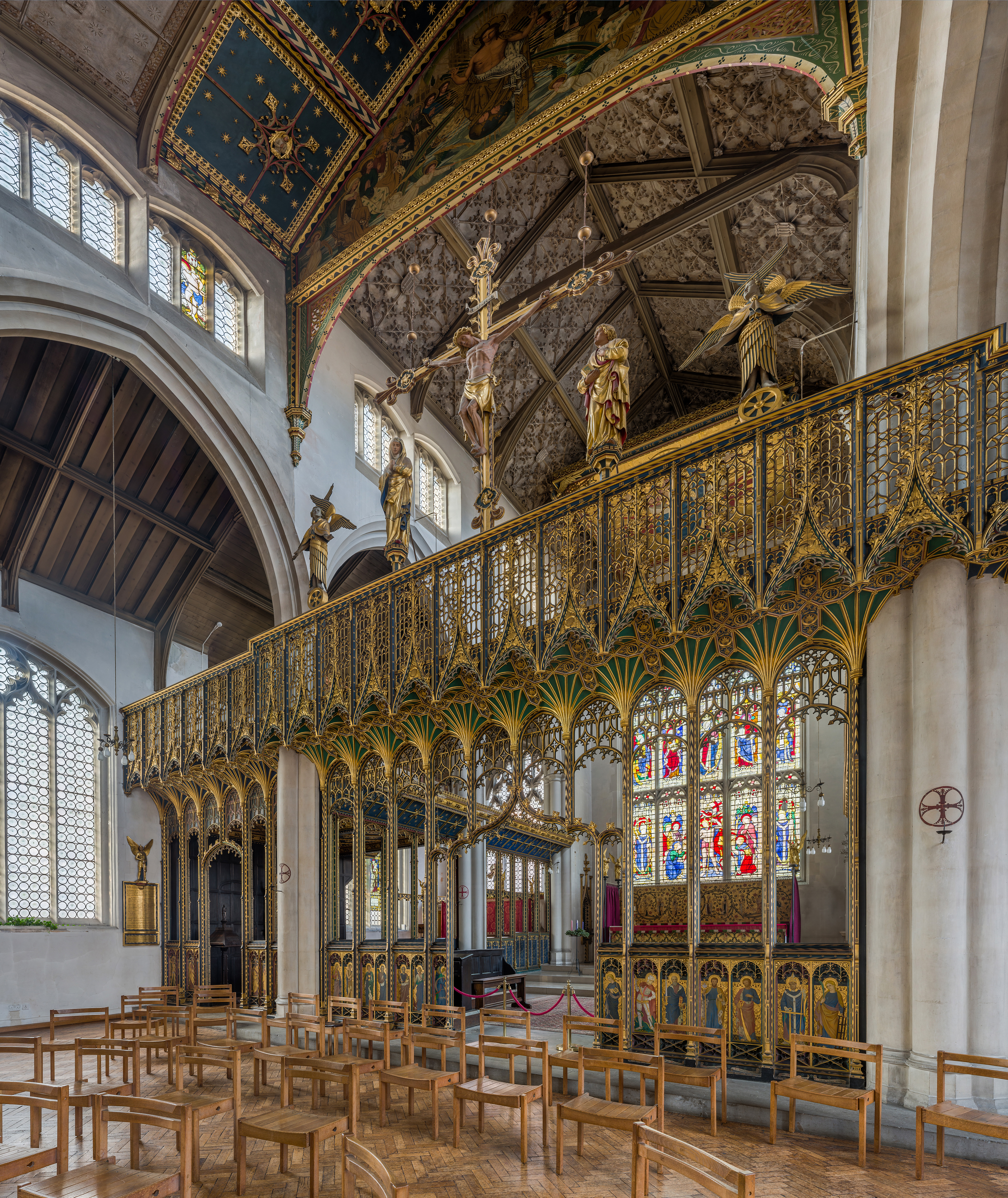
The rood screen

== See also ==
- London Shostakovich Orchestra
- St Cyprian's Cathedral, Kimberley
