= John Darragh (priest) =

Anglican priest and educator in South Africa

John Thomas Darragh was a graduate of Trinity College, Dublin who served as a priest and school master in the Anglican Church in South Africa in the late nineteenth century, at Kimberley and in Johannesburg, where he was the founder of St John's College.

== St Cyprian's, Kimberley ==
Darragh was on the staff of St Cyprian's Church in Kimberley from at least 1881, when he contributed an article to the Quarterly Paper of the Free State Mission. In the early 1880s he placed services on a more regular footing at St Alban's, De Beers (a chapelry then of St Cyprian's), which met in the old De Beers Boardroom. In 1883 he was teaching at the St Cyprian’s Mission School accommodated in a tin house in Clarence Street, Kimberley: Darragh taught "the half-castes who nearly all spoke Dutch". He produced over 70 communicants from among the 200 pupils at the school. Darragh also took classes, with Canon Gaul, at St Cyprian's Grammar School: "The idea was to keep the boys’ school in the first place among the Kimberley Schools."

== St Mary's, Johannesburg, and the founding of St John's College ==
In 1887 John Darragh went to the Gold Fields and laboured there for thirty years. He was appointed Rector of St Mary's Anglican Church in Eloff Street, Johannesburg. In 1898 he was responsible for the establishment of an Anglican school for boys, the St John's College, with his curate the Revd J.L. Hodgson as first Headmaster.

Whereas many English-speaking people were expelled from Johannesburg during the Anglo-Boer War, Darragh, as a priest, was allowed to remain and did so.

== Controversy over revision to the Book of Common Prayer ==
An Anglo-Catholic opposition to the 1920 South African edition of the Book of Common Prayer was led by Darragh.

== Publications ==
- The Resurrection of the Flesh. Society for Promoting Christian Knowledge. 1921.
