= Ranulph Vincent =

English dean (??–1914)

The Very Revd John Ranulph Vincent was Dean of Bloemfontein, in South Africa, from 1892; and afterwards of Grahamstown, 1912–1914.

== Background and education ==
Vincent was the son of the Revd R. Vincent, of Crockham Hall in Kent. He took an M.A. at St John's College, Oxford, then reading theology at Ely Theological College where he completed his studies in 1885.

== Ordination and initial appointments ==
He was ordained Deacon at Christ Church Cathedral, Oxford, on 20 December 1885. The following year he was ordained Priest, also at Oxford Cathedral.

Vincent’s first posting was as Curate of Aylesbury in 1886, followed by a move in 1889 to Ely Theological College as Chaplain and Lecturer, remaining there until 1892.

== Bloemfontein ==
In 1892 Vincent accepted an appointment as Dean of Bloemfontein in South Africa.

He had the misfortune, as Lewis puts it, to be Dean during the Anglo-Boer War of 1899-1902, a centre of much fighting. He in fact served for the duration of the war as Vicar General when the See was vacant. Just months before the outbreak of war, in June 1899, he had married Evelyn Templer of Lynbridge, Devon. In 1902 Vincent and his young bride returned to England, where he took up the Rectorship of the parish of Clapham, remaining there until 1906.

But "Africa has a strange magnetism," as Lewis says, and the Vincents went out again to the Orange Free State where John Ranulph Vincent became Rector of Bethlehem.

As Vicar General, again, in 1908, Vincent presided at the dedication of the new St Cyprian's Church in Kimberley, soon to be elevated to being a cathedral.

== Grahamstown ==
Vincent was asked to accept the post of Dean of Grahamstown, in 1912. He died of typhoid in Grahamstown just two years later and was buried at the Old Cemetery there.

He was known in Grahamstown as a keen Freemason and True Templer.

== Bell-ringer ==
J. R. Vincent was a competent change-ringer, as documented by Lewis: he had distinguished himself among the ringing members of the Oxford University Society of Change Ringers in his student days.

In February 1914 Vincent, together with the Revd (later Canon) G. H. Ridout of Johannesburg and Percy Holt, rang extents of Grandsire Doubles on handbells in the Deanery at Grahamstown. He died three months later on 2 May.
