= Neville Borton =

Rector of St Cyprian's Church

Neville Arthur Blachley Borton, M.A., (fl. 1876–1920) was the second rector of St Cyprian's Church, Kimberley, South Africa, serving from 1876–77, being successor to Fr John Witherston Rickards. He afterwards ran a small church school at St Mary's Barkly West, was appointed principal of St Andrew's, Bloemfontein, and subsequently Vicar of Burwell, Cambridge, where he served until 1920.

== Coming to South Africa ==
Borton was one of four priests brought to the Diocese of Bloemfontein by Bishop Allan Becher Webb in 1876 - the others being Frs Maude, Balfour and Tobias.

== Work on the Diamond Fields ==
Bishop Webb sent the Revds Borton and Maude straight on to the Diamond Fields, where Borton succeeded Rickards as priest in charge of st Cyprian's, which was still part of the Parish of All Saints, DuToitspan (Beaconsfield). Subsequently, Borton was associated with a school attached to St Mary's, Barkly West. There, in 1878, the Revd and Mrs Borton lost all their possessions in a fire. Not long afterwards an opening was made for him at St Andrew's in Bloemfontein.

== Bloemfontein ==
Borton furthered his role in teaching in his appointment as Principal of St Andrew's College in Bloemfontein. Large numbers of boarders went across to St Andrew's from "Kimberley and thereabouts" on account of Borton's reputation on the Diamond Fields.

In 1882, Bishop Webb created a new stall in the cathedral and collated Borton to it, which is to say he was made a Canon of Bloemfontein Cathedral.

== Family ==
Ultimately Borton was Vicar of Burwell, Cambridge.

He married Annie Louisa, daughter of the Revd Edward Heale of All Saints, Jersey. Their elder son Cyprian Edward Borton, born at Barkly West in 1879, rose to the rank of Major, 129th, Duke of Connaught's Own Baluchis, and was killed in action at Imad, Aden, on Thursday, 2 August 1917.
