= Philip Wheeldon =

British Anglican bishop (1913–92)

The Right Reverend Philip Wheeldon OBE
- Former Bishop of Whitby & Kimberley and Kuruman
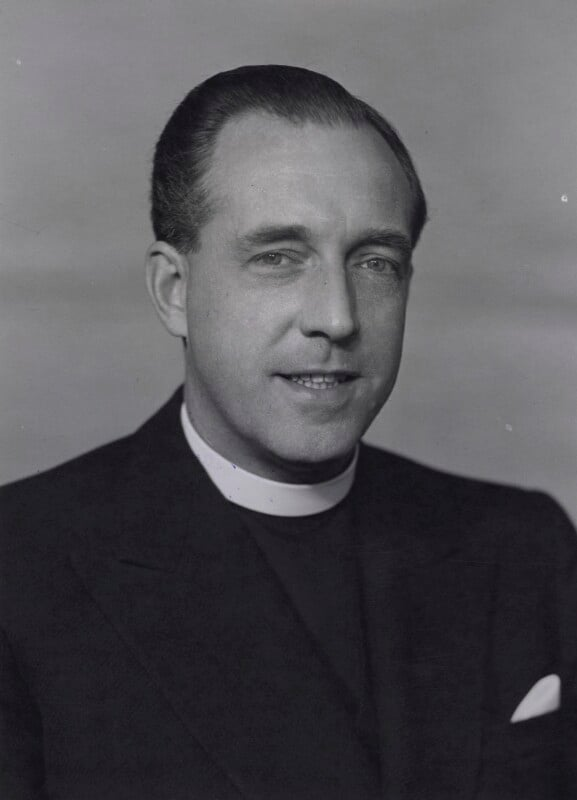
- Wheeldon in 1954
- Church: Church of England
- Diocese: Diocese of York
- Installed: 1954
- Predecessor: Walter Baddeley
- Other posts: Bishop of Whitby & Kimberley and Kuruman, Chaplain to the Forces, Fourth Class, Prebendary of Wells Cathedral, Assistant Bishop at Worcester & Wakefield

Orders
- Ordination: 1954
- Consecration: c. 1954

Personal details
- Born: 1913
- Died: 11 July 1992 (aged 79)
- Denomination: Anglican
- Education: University of Cambridge

Philip William Wheeldon OBE (1913–1992) was the fourth Bishop of Whitby and twice Bishop of Kimberley and Kuruman.

== Life ==
He was educated at Clifton College and then at Downing College, Cambridge, the college frequented by the family. He was ordained in 1938. He sat for a number of portraits which are now housed in the National Portrait Gallery, London.

After a curacy at Farnham he was commissioned as Chaplain to the Forces, Fourth Class on 12 October 1939, and served throughout the Second World War. He was appointed Officer of the Order of the British Empire on 24 January 1946, for his service as Deputy Assistant Chaplain General to XII Corps from November 1944 (with the rank of Chaplain to the Forces, Second Class) in the Queen's Birthday Honours, and presented to him by Her Majesty Queen Elizabeth II.

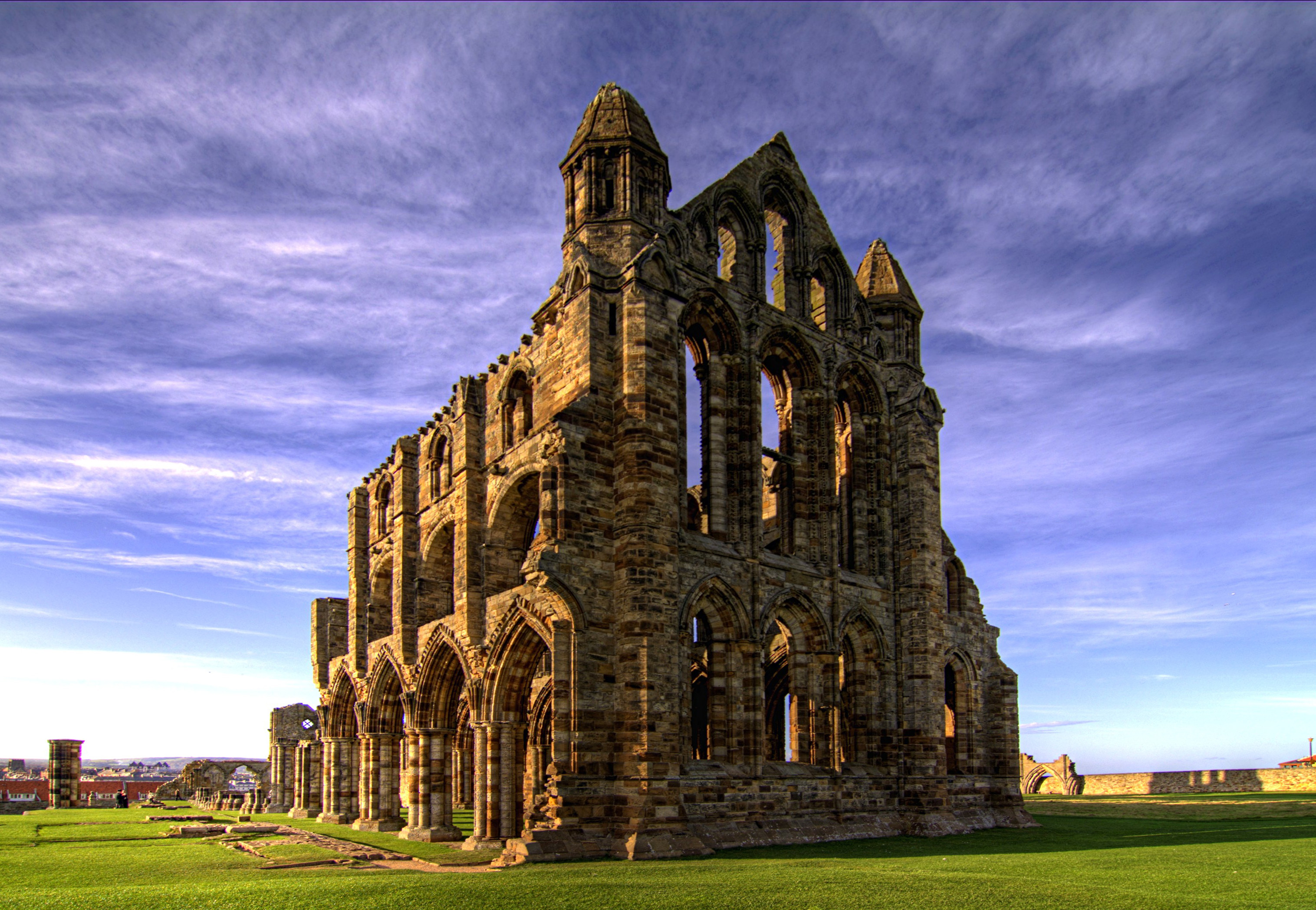
Whitby Abbey, the seat of the Bishop of Whitby

When peace came he was successively chaplain to the Archbishop of York, General Secretary of the Central Advisory Council on Training for the Ministry and finally Prebendary of Wells Cathedral.

In this post he served as the attendant of the Archbishop of York in the Coronation of Queen Elizabeth II before elevation to the Episcopate in October 1954. This was just prior to this Enthronement in 1954, as Bishop of Whitby.

After 7 years at Whitby he was translated to Kimberley and Kuruman in South Africa. He served twice as Bishop, retiring once through ill-health but returning when his successor Clarence Edward Crowther was deported. In retirement he served as an Assistant Bishop, firstly in the Diocese of Worcester and latterly at Wakefield.

In 1992, he died and his death was recorded by obituaries in the Telegraph and the Times newspapers.

== Notes ==
Church of England titles
Preceded by Walter Hubert Baddeley	Bishop of Whitby; 1954 – 1961	Succeeded by George D'Oyly Snow
Anglican Church of Southern Africa titles
Preceded by John Boys	Bishop of Kimberley and Kuruman; 1961 – 1965	Succeeded by Clarence Edward Crowther
Preceded by Clarence Edward Crowther	Bishop of Kimberley and Kuruman; 2nd spell 1968 – 1976	Succeeded by Graham Charles Chadwick
