= St Cyprian's Grammar School, Kimberley =

Coordinates: 28°44′32″S 24°46′12″E

St Cyprian’s Grammar School
- Kimberley; South Africa

Information
- Type: Private/Independent
- Motto: Excellence, Quality and Truth
- Established: 2009
- Closed: 2021
- Locale: 5 Park Road, Kimberley
- Head teacher: Gary Glass
- Grades: R, 1-12
- Enrollment: 147
- Website: www.stcyprians.itgo.com/whats_new.html

St. Cyprian's Grammar School in Kimberley, South Africa, is a co-educational English-medium independent school for Grades R and 1–12, attached to St Cyprian's Cathedral (Anglican Diocese of Kimberley and Kuruman, Anglican Church of Southern Africa). In its present form it opened to 83 students on 21 January 2009. St Cyprian's is one of the pilot schools within the Historic Schools Restoration Project initiated by Archbishop Emeritus Njongonkulu Ndungane.

== History ==
The Parish of St Cyprian on the Diamond Fields played a crucial role in establishing Kimberley's first schools from the early 1870s. A Mission School (later called Perseverance), a St Cyprian's Grammar School, and a Girls’ School (later St Michael's) were established. The Grammar School and St Michael's went into decline in the 1890s after government schools were opened. In the early twentieth century Perseverance became a training school for teachers and from it, at a later stage, would arise the Gore Browne Training School (named after first Diocesan Bishop Wilfrid Gore Browne). Many fine teachers would owe their formation to these institutions. Under apartheid education and the Group Areas Act they were taken over, and eventually closed. In 2007 Archbishop Emeritus Njongonkulu Ndungane was making it a special project to bring historic church schools back to life as centres of educational excellence. St Cyprian's Cathedral in Kimberley, then celebrating the centenary of its cathedral building, was inspired by this vision and its own legacy to revive a role in education, and by June 2008 was taking active steps to bring St Cyprian's Grammar School to new birth. St. Cyprians, over its years has produced great talents such as the incredible vocal skills of one Samantha Leonard, the wonderful rhythms of the Marimba Group led by Teboho Bojabotsheha and not forgetting the angelic sounds of the St. Cyprians Choir formed and conducted by the Head herself, Mrs Anne Solomon.

== Opening and dedication, 2009 ==
Opening on 21 January 2009, in buildings within the cathedral precinct, the music and arts focus finds expression in weekly performing arts hours on Fridays and a monthly concert.

The school was dedicated on the 101st anniversary of the cathedral's dedication on 13 May 2009, when the Head of the School, a Head Student and Chaplain were licensed. The Board of Governors, established by the Bishop in 2008, is chaired by the Dean of Kimberley.

== Productions and concerts ==
=== Godspell and Fame ===
Within eight months of opening, and for the Patronal Festival, the school mounted an acclaimed production of Godspell, which is based on the parables of Christ from the Gospel of St Matthew. The Cathedral proved to be the ideal setting for the work, which has a quasi liturgical structure: a drawing near for the liturgy of the word (Act 1) followed (in Act 2) by, inter alia, the Last Supper and the Passion, with a final recessional – down the aisle, and out into the world – proclaiming a living God and recapitulating the Baptist's Cry: “Prepare ye the way of the Lord.” The following year the school produced the musical Fame

=== Benefit Concert ===
One of the performing highlights in the first year of the school's existence was a benefit concert in the cathedral, presented in association with the Kimberley Academy of Music. Choral ensembles, vocal soloists, percussionists, and a marimba group performed. Earlier, one of the students, Jimmy Hsu, was soloist in a performance of a Haydn violin concerto with the Free State Youth Orchestra.

=== Vivaldi's Gloria ===
In 2012 the St Cyprian's Grammar School Choir, accompanied by strings and continuo, gave performances, in the cathedral, of Antonio Vivaldi's Gloria.
