= Nancy Charton =

First female priest in the Anglican Church of Southern Africa

- Church: Anglican
- Province: Southern Africa

Orders
- Ordination: 1992 by David Russell

Personal details
- Born: 1920
- Died: November 11, 2015 (aged 94–95) Graaff Reinet

Nancy Charton Ph.D. (1920 – 2015) was the first female ordained priest in the Anglican Church of Southern Africa.

Charton was a lecturer and later associate professor in the Department of Politics at Rhodes University. She was also a deacon at St Bartholomew's Church, Grahamstown. In September 1992 she was ordained priest by David Russell in the Grahamstown Cathedral.

== Works ==
- Meyer, Wilhelm Henry, ed. (2009). The Calling: The Story of a Pioneering Woman Priest. Pietermaritzburg: Cluster Publications. ISBN 978-1-875053-79-7.
- "English-speaking white elites in South African politics". Politikon. 2 (2): 115–128. 2007. doi:10.1080/02589347508704682. ISSN 0258-9346.
- "The Witness of the Church of the Province of Southern Africa". International Review of Mission. 83 (328): 153–157. 1994. doi:10.1111/j.1758-6631.1994.tb02355.x. ISSN 0020-8582.
- Brenda Nicholls; Nancy Charton; Mary Knowling (1998). The Diary of Robert John Mullins (1833-1913). Grahamstown: Rhodes University, Department of History.
- "Black elites in the Transkei". Politikon. 3 (2): 61–74. 1976. doi:10.1080/02589347608704706. ISSN 0258-9346.
- Ciskei: Economics and Politics of Dependence in a South African Homeland. Croom Helm. 1980. ISBN 978-0-7099-0332-1.
