= Frederick Williams (priest) =

Frederick Henry Williams (1826 – 22 August 1885) was a 19th-century Anglican clergyman, considered at the time to be a controversial figure.

== Personal life ==
Williams was born at Skea House, County Fermanagh, Ireland in 1826, the son of George Campbell Williams, his mother's maiden name was Harrold. Frederick Henry Williams married Jane Susannah Gael in London on 3 June 1863 and was divorced 7 June 1882. They had one son, George Frederick Charles Williams. Frederick Henry Williams died 22 August 1885 aged 59 in Grahamstown, South Africa.

== Grahamstown Cathedral ==
Williams was appointed Dean of Grahamstown 1865. Various schemes had been discussed from time to time for the building of a more worthy Cathedral, but nothing was done until 1874, when it was discovered that the original tower, in which the town clock had been placed, was in danger. Dean Williams at once set about the work of collecting funds, and was loyally supported by the vestry. Plans were prepared for the tower and spire as part of a complete new building by Sir George Gilbert Scott, at that time the outstanding leader of the Gothic revival. He made a free gift to Grahamstown of the various plans and working details, and the building of the "Public Clock Tower", as it was called, was carried through by the committee without employing a contractor. Liberal help was received from Port Elizabeth, and the tower was erected for £5,171 17s. 11d. This was exclusive of £1,200 for the bells, raised mainly by the civil commissioner, Mr Huntly, and Mr Robert King of Port Elizabeth. The tower and spire were finished in 1878, Dean Williams made the ultimate re-building of the cathedral on the present scale inevitable.

== Ecclesiastical controversy ==
The Diocese of Grahamstown was founded in 1853 with John Armstrong as the first bishop. During the oversight of the third bishop, Nathaniel Merriman and while Frederick Henry Williams was Dean conflict arose between the two regarding the status of the Church of the Province of Southern Africa versus the Church of England and the validity of the appointments of bishops. Dean Williams then excluded Bishop Merriman from his Cathedral. This action resulted in many court cases which Williams won. After Merriman's death in 1882, Allan Webb was made bishop, and he too was excluded from the cathedral by Williams. Webb set up his cathedral (the Pro-cathedral of St Michael) in November 1883 in what was the ice rink, a zinc building which stood where the post office now is.

== Personal controversy ==
The 1884 court case of Williams v Shaw, in which “the Very Rev Frederick Henry Williams, DD, clerk in Holy Orders and the colonial chaplain, rector and dean of St George’s, Grahamstown”, brought a defamation action against William Bunting Shaw, an “enrolled agent of the Grahamstown magistrate’s court”. Williams claimed £1 000 from Shaw, saying he had falsely said that he, Williams, had been guilty of infidelity to his wife, was a liar, a thief – and an atheist. The court found so much of what Shaw had claimed was proved true that the untrue defamatory matter left over warranted only nominal damages. They ordered the parties to pay their own costs and awarded Williams just a shilling.
