= Robert Selby Taylor =

Anglican archbishop (1909–1995)

Robert Selby Taylor CBE OGS (1 March 1909 – 23 April 1995) was an Anglican bishop in the 20th century.

Selby Taylor was educated at Harrow and St Catharine's College, Cambridge. Ordained in 1933, his first post was a curacy at St Olave's Church, York. He then emigrated to Africa to become a Missionary Priest in the Diocese of Northern Rhodesia, rising to become principal of its diocesan theological college and then in 1951 bishop of the diocese. Translated to Pretoria a decade later and Grahamstown in 1959 he was appointed Archbishop of Cape Town in 1964. Ten years later he announced his retirement but in 1979 he was petitioned to return to a part of his first diocese and serve as Bishop of Central Zambia.

In 1983 he was honoured by The Queen (made a Commander of the Order of the British Empire) and in 1991, the Archbishop of Canterbury conferred on him the Lambeth Doctorate of Divinity to mark his fifty years of service in the episcopate. A Sub Prelate of the Order of St John of Jerusalem, he died on 23 April 1995. A Chair at the University of Cape Town is named in his honour and in 2009 events were held to honour his centenary. Many of his papers are stored at the University of the Witwatersrand. He was a member of the Oratory of the Good Shepherd.

Anglican Communion titles
Preceded by Alston May	Bishop of Northern Rhodesia; 1941–1951	Succeeded by Oliver Green-Wilkinson
Preceded by Wilfrid Parker	Bishop of Pretoria; 1951–1959	Succeeded by Edward Knapp-Fisher
Preceded by Archibald Cullen	Bishop of Grahamstown; 1959–1964	Succeeded by Gordon Tindall
Preceded by Joost de Blank	Archbishop of Cape Town; 1964–1974	Succeeded by Bill Burnett
Preceded by Jack Cunningham	Bishop of Central Zambia; 1979–1984	Succeeded by Clement Shaba
