= Derek Kamukwamba =

Derek Gary Kamukwamba is an Anglican bishop in Zambia. He was Bishop of Central Zambia during 2008.

Anglican Communion titles
Preceded by Clement Shaba	Bishop of Central Zambia; 2008	Succeeded by Incumbent
