= Francis Phelps =

Anglican bishop (1863–1938)

The Most Reverend Francis Phelps
- Archbishop of Cape Town
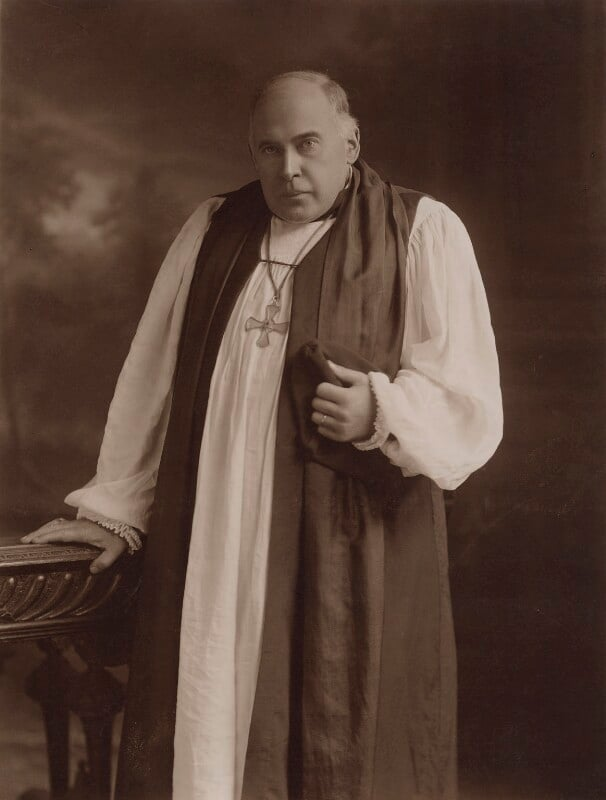
- Phelps, c. 1910s
- Church: Anglican
- Province: Southern Africa

Orders
- Ordination: 1888

Personal details
- Born: Francis Robinson Phelps; 19 September 1863 Canada
- Died: 27 June 1938 (aged 74)
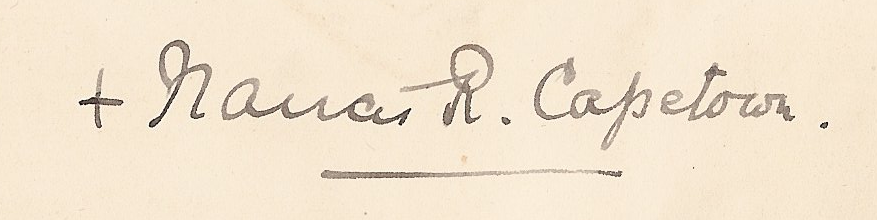
- Signature

Francis Robinson Phelps (19 September 1863 – 26 June 1938) was an Anglican bishop in the first half of the 20th century.

== Early life ==
Phelps was born in Canada on 19 September 1863 and educated at Keble College, Oxford. he was made deacon in 1887 and ordained priest in 1888. Following curacies at Battersea, St John the Evangelist, Westminster and St John the Divine, Kennington he was rector of Thorpe Episcopi, Norfolk.

== South Africa ==
Phelps and his family emigrated to South Africa in 1909, he was successively warden of St Peter's Home in Grahamstown and Archdeacon of Grahamstown. He was appointed Dean of Grahamstown in 1914.

Phelps was elected Bishop of Grahamstown in 1915. In 1931 he was translated to Cape Town. His consecration as archbishop was challenged by other Anglican clergy in the civil court in Cape Town. The court found for Phelps.

Due to ill-health Phelps resigned as archbishop in 1937, He died less than a year later on 27 June 1938. in Oxford.

Phelps married Edith Hunter in 1895.

Anglican Church of Southern Africa titles
Preceded by Charles Edward Cornish	Bishop of Grahamstown; 1915 – 1931	Succeeded by Archibald Howard Cullen
Preceded by William Marlborough Carter	Archbishop of Cape Town; 1931 – 1938	Succeeded by John Russell Darbyshire
