= Gordon Tindall =

- Bishop of Grahamstown
- Diocese: Diocese of Grahamstown
- In office: 1964–1969
- Predecessor: Robert Selby Taylor
- Successor: Bill Burnett

Orders
- Ordination: 1936

Personal details
- Born: 13 February 1911
- Died: 24 June 1969

Gordon Leslie Tindall (1911 – 24 June 1969) was the eighth Bishop of Grahamstown.

== Family ==
His parents were George William Tindall (4 July 1878 - 30 August 1963), from Bilsby, and Alice Dann (13 November 1873-). His mother's father, Thomas Dann, was the postmaster of Legbourne. His parents were married on 25 July 1902 by Rev Fox at All Saints at Legbourne. They moved to Orby in 1912. His father died, aged 85, in August 1963.

Brother Horace George Tindall (1904-) was also a vicar. In October 1952 Horace became vicar of All Saints in Hutton, Essex.

On Monday 1 June 1936, his only sister Kathleen Alice Tindall married at All Saints church in Orby, with the service taken by her brother Horace, and assisted by Gordon. Kathleen died aged 88 on 4 May 1995 in Skegness Hospital.

His brother (David) Nigel Tindall, (27 June 1914 - 12 June 1988), attended Durham University (St Chad's College, Durham), leaving in 1939. Nigel became a vicar, training at Lincoln, being ordained on 20 December 1942 at Lincoln Cathedral. From March 1950 Nigel was the vicar of Elsham (All Saints) and Worlaby. In August 1957 Nigel became vicar of Rillington. By the 1970s Nigel was the vicar of Trimdon in County Durham. Nigel died aged 73 in June 1988 at 4 Linden Grove, Leadgate, County Durham.

== Early life ==
He grew up in Orby, and attended St Paul's College in Burgh le Marsh, and Queen Elizabeth's Grammar School, Alford; he attended the school's speech day in July 1966.

Tindall was educated at Hatfield College, Durham.

== Career ==
Ordained in 1936, his first post was a curacy in Swinton.

In October 1937 he emigrated to the Bechuanaland Protectorate (Botswana from 1966), to become a missionary priest. From 1939 he was rector of Vryburg, then director of the South Bechuanaland Mission. Later he was archdeacon of King William's Town, then diocesan director of religious education in Grahamstown before his appointment to the episcopate.

== Personal life ==
His wife was Grace Smith (1911-93).

Anglican Church of Southern Africa titles
Preceded by Robert Selby Taylor	Bishop of Grahamstown; 1964–1969	Succeeded by Bill Burnett
