= Michael Berning =

South African bell ringer, Librarian, author

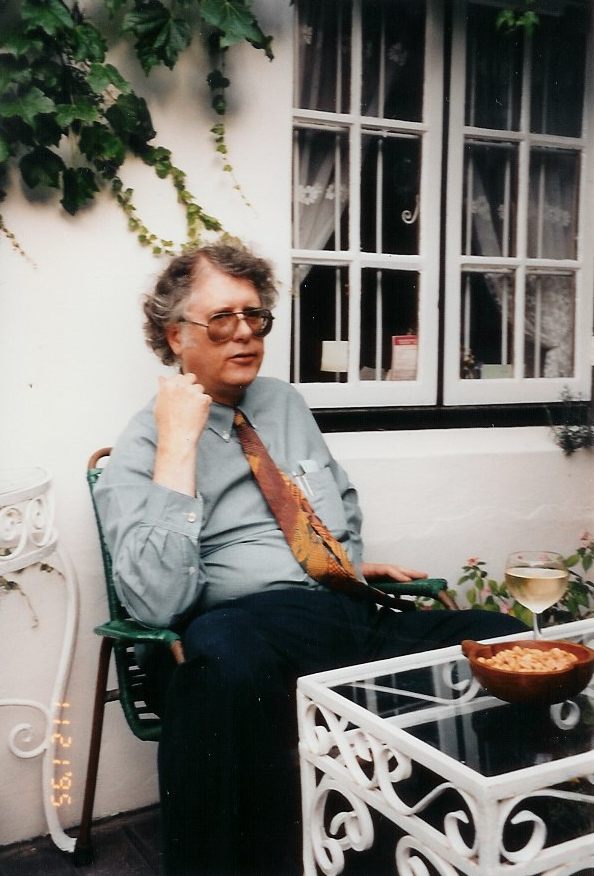
- Born: 12 April 1941; Johannesburg
- Died: 12 July 2006 (aged 65); Grahamstown
- Education: Rhodes University
- Occupations: Librarian, author, anglican and bell ringer
- Known for: Head of Cory Library (1965) and Deputy University Librarian (1978-1999) Rhodes University

Mike Berning (1941 - 2006) was a South African librarian, author, and bell ringer. He is best known as a Head of Cory Library (1965) and Deputy University Librarian.

== Career ==
=== Professional life ===
In the first part of 1965 Berning was employed in the South African Library in Cape Town, but in September of that year he was appointed Librarian of the Cory Library at Rhodes University. From 1978 until 1986 he acted as Deputy to the University Librarian until, in 1988, the post of Deputy University Librarian was created, to which he was appointed. Berning retired in 1999.

=== Bell ringing ===
In 1968 Dean Kenneth Oram sought volunteers to ring the Grahamstown Cathedral bells. Berning, who was very involved in the life of the cathedral, was one of the recruits. Berning took over as Tower Captain, through a very difficult period in the 1980s, held a band together and continued to teach recruits. He helped found the South African Guild of Church Bell Ringers in 1988. Berning was instrumental in petitioning the Parish Council for permission to rehang the bells in a new frame. He also helped obtain the support of the Mayor of Grahamstown and City Council for the rehanging project. Berning was one of the band who rang the bells for the first time in their new frame, on Christmas Eve, 1993.

== Awards ==
- Order of Simon of Cyrene in 2006.

== Publications ==
- John Michael Berning (1971). Southwell Settlers. The author.
- John Michael Berning (1972). A Select Bibliography on the 1820 Settlers and Settlement: Compiled by J M Berning. 1820 Settlers National Monument Foundation and Rhodes University Publications Department.
- Brian P. Gaybba; C. J. De Wet; Michael Smout; Terence Anthony Marsh; Andrew Robert Donaldson; Paul Maylam; George Carter; Roger Southall; Brian R. Gardner; Daryl Lee; William Thomas Futter; John Michael Berning (1992). Special Supplement: Rhodes the Debate Ahead. Rhodes University, Department of Philosophy.
- J.M. Berning (1989). The Historical "Conversations" of Sir George Cory. Maskew Miller Longman. ISBN 978-0-636-01197-7.
- John Michael Berning (1987). Grahamstown Training College Archives, Methodist Archives Collection, Supplement No. 6, and Smaller Collections. Cory Library for Historical Research, Rhodes University. ISBN 978-0-86810-151-4.
- Quarterly Bulletin of the National Library of South Africa. Friends of the National Library of South Africa. 2006. p. 89.
- Quarterly Bulletin of the National Library of South Africa. Friends of the National Library of South Africa. 2006. p. 87.

== Personal life ==
Mike Berning was born John Michael Berning in Johannesburg on 4 December 1941. He attended the King Edward VII School in Johannesburg. He attended Rhodes University in 1960, where he studied history, graduating in with an Honours degree in 1963. He continued his studies at the University of Cape Town in 1964. In 1968 he was awarded a Diploma in Librarianship from UCT. He died in Grahamstown on 7 December 2006, he was married to Ann.

== Notes and references ==
- Lewis, C. A. (2007). "John Michael Berning (14.12.1941- 17.12.2006) : obituary". The Ringing World (4995): 72. Archived from the original on 22 January 2013.
- Anon (2008). "Ordination, Cathedral of Ss Michael & George, Grahamstown, 16 December 2008". Diocese of Grahamstown.
