= Bishop of Grahamstown =

- Bishopric

Anglican
- Incumbent; Mcebisi Pinyana since 31 July 2023

Location
- Ecclesiastical province: Southern Africa

Information
- Diocese: Grahamstown
- Cathedral: St. Michael and St. George Cathedral

The Bishop of Grahamstown is the Ordinary of the Diocese of Grahamstown in the Anglican Church of Southern Africa. The Bishop's residence is at Bishopsbourne, Grahamstown.

== List of Bishops of Grahamstown ==
=== Diocesan bishops ===
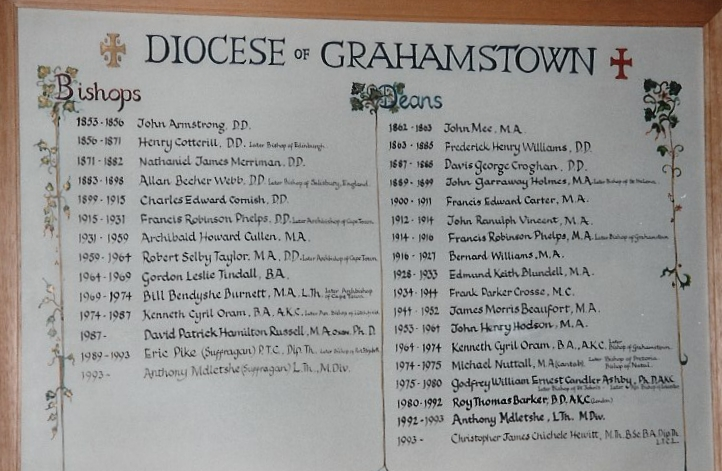
Diocese Chart showing Bishops and Deans of St. Michael and St. George Cathedral.

1. John Armstrong, D.D. 1853-1856
2. Henry Cotterill, M.A., D.D. 1856-1871 (Later bishop of Edinburgh)
3. Nathaniel James Merriman, D.D. 1871-1882
4. Allan Becher Webb, D.D. 1883-1898 (Later dean of Salisbury, England)
5. Charles Edward Cornish, D.D. 1899-1915
6. Francis Robinson Phelps, D.D. 1915-1931 (Later Archbishop of Cape Town)
7. Archibald Howard Cullen, M.A. 1931-1959
8. Robert Selby Taylor, M.A., D.D. 1959-1964 (Later archbishop of Cape Town)
9. Gordon Leslie Tindall, B.A. 1964-1969
10. Bill Bendyshe Burnett, M.A. L.Th. 1969-1974 (Later archbishop of Cape Town)
11. Kenneth Cyril Oram, B.A., A.K.C. 1974-1987 (Later assistant bishop of Lichfield)
12. David Patrick Hamilton Russell, M.A., Ph.D. 1987-2004
13. Thabo Cecil Makgoba, B.Sc. B.A. (Hons) MEd Ph.D. 2004-2007 (LaterArchbishop of Cape Town)
14. Ebenezer St Mark Ntlali, Dip.Th. B.A. (Hons) B.Th. 2007–2023
15. Mcebisi Pinyana,Dip.Th. B.A. (Hons) MPhil. 2025-present

=== Bishops suffragan ===
The following were bishops suffragan in the diocese:

- Eric Pike, P.T.C., Dip.Th. 1989-1993 (Later bishop of Port Elizabeth)
- Anthony Mdletshe, L.Th., M.Div. 1993-1997 (Later bishop of Zululand)
- Bethlehem Nopece, Dip.Th. B.Th. M.Th. 1998-2002 (Later bishop of Port Elizabeth)
- Thabo Cecil Makgoba, B.Sc. B.A. (Hons) MEd.(Psychology) Ph.D. 2002-2004 (afterwards bishop of Grahamstown)
