= Ebenezer Ntlali =

South African Anglican bishop (born 1954)

The Right Reverend Ebenezer St Mark Ntlali
- Bishop of Grahamstown
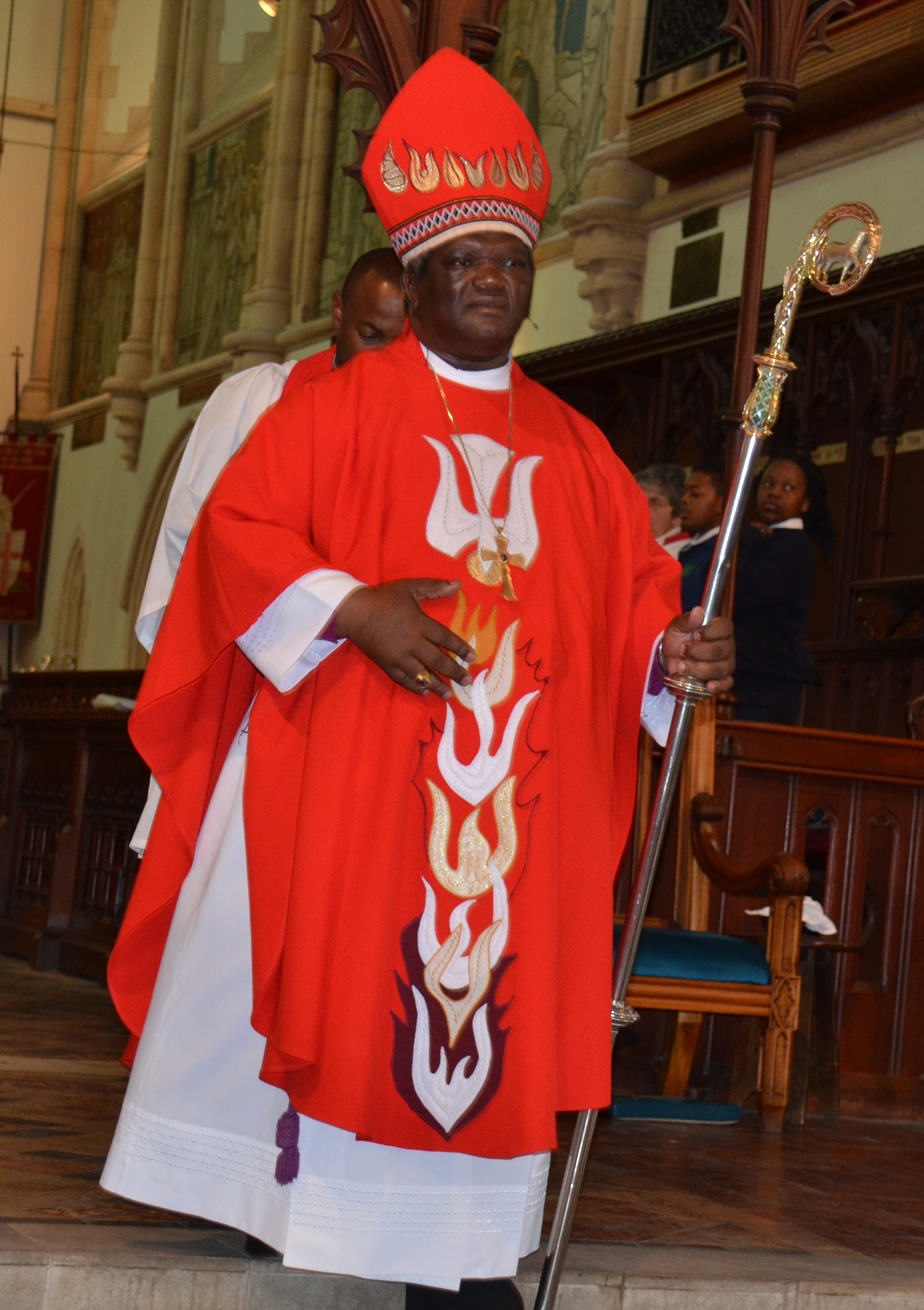
- Church: Anglican Church of Southern Africa
- Diocese: Grahamstown
- In office: 2007 – 2023
- Predecessor: Thabo Makgoba
- Successor: Mcebisi Pinyana
- Previous post: Archdeacon of King William's Town

Orders
- Ordination: 1990
- Consecration: 2007

Personal details
- Born: 1954 (age 71–72) Richmond, Northern Cape
- Denomination: Anglicanism

Ebenezer St Mark Ntlali (born 1954 in Richmond, Northern Cape) is a South African Anglican retired bishop. He was the fourteenth Bishop of Grahamstown.

He trained for the priesthood at St Bede's College, Transkei, and has a bachelor's degree in church history and systematic theology from Rhodes University. He was archdeacon of King William's Town until his consecration as a bishop in 2007.

On 30 July 2023, he retired as the bishop of Grahamstown.

== Notes and references ==
- Asendorpf, Dirk (2001). Hamburger Beiträge zur Afrika-Kunde (in German). Hamburg, Germany: Deutsches Institut für Afrika-Forschung & Institut für Afrika-Kunde. ISBN 9783928049801.
- Crockford's Clerical Directory. Oxford University Press. 1973.
- Parle, Julie (2003). "Witchcraft or Madness? The Amandiki of Zululand, 1894-1914*". Journal of Southern African Studies. 29 (1): 105–132. doi:10.1080/0305707032000060502. ISSN 0305-7070. S2CID 144032360.
- Siphelo Dyongman (6 December 2013). "Carry each other's burdens - Bishop Ntlali". Grocott's Mail. Grahamstown. Archived from the original on 3 September 2014.
- AvuyileMngxitama-Diko (16 November 2012). "Respect our special days, says Bishop Ebenezer". Grocott's Mail. Archived from the original on 3 September 2014.
- Thabo Jijana (23 March 2011). "They've got nothing on us, say activists | Abahlali baseMjondolo". Grocott's Mail.
- Keepile, Karabo (8 April 2009). "Holier than thou". Mail & Guardian.

Anglican Church of Southern Africa titles
Preceded by Thabo Makgoba	Bishop of Grahamstown; 2007 –	Incumbent
