= Mcebisi Pinyana =

South African Anglican bishop

The Right Reverend Mcebisi Pinyana
- Bishop of Grahamstown
- Church: Anglican Church of Southern Africa
- Diocese: Grahamstown
- In office: Since 2025
- Predecessor: Ebenezer Ntlali

Orders
- Consecration: November 2025

Mcebisi Pinyana is the fifteenth and current Bishop of the Anglican Diocese of Grahamstown in South Africa. He was previously an Archdeacon to the Ordinary in the Diocese of Cape Town, before that he was Dean of the St John's Cathedral, Mthatha. He was enthroned as bishop at Cathedral of St Michael and St George on 22 November 2025.'
