= Garth Counsell =

South African Anglican bishop

Garth Counsell was bishop of Table Bay, a suffragan bishop of the Anglican Diocese of Cape Town, from 2004 to 2020. He was succeeded by Joshua Louw. Like the Bishop of Dover he was in effect the Diocesan Bishop as his superior is Primate of an Ecclesiastical Province.
