= Bill Burnett =

South African bishop

The Most Reverend Bill Burnett
- Archbishop of Cape Town and Primate of the Anglican Church of Southern Africa
- Burnett's portrait by James Eddie
- Church: Anglican Church of Southern Africa
- See: Cape Town
- In office: 1974–1981
- Predecessor: Robert Selby Taylor
- Successor: Philip Russell
- Previous post: Bishop of Grahamstown

Orders
- Ordination: 1946 and 1947
- Consecration: 1967

Personal details
- Born: 1917 Koffiefontein
- Died: 23 August 1994 (aged 76–77) Grahamstown
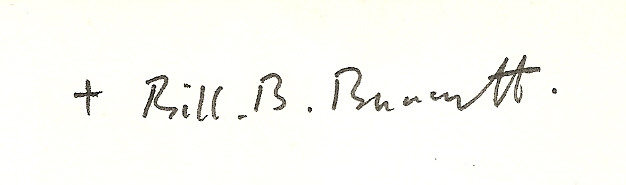
- Signature

Bill Bendyshe Burnett (1917–1994) was a South African Anglican bishop and archbishop. He was archbishop of Cape Town from 1974 to 1981.

== Personal life ==
Burnett was born in Koffiefontein on 31 May 1917. He was the son of Richard Evelyn Burnett, a British-born bank manager, and his wife, Louisa Martha Dobinson.

Burnett grew up speaking Afrikaans and English, at a time when racial discrimination was growing toward Apartheid. Burnett called racial segregation morally indefensible.

Burnett married Sheila Fulton Trollip at the end of World War II in 1945 when he was 28 years old. Together, they raised a family of two sons, Andrew and Stephen, and a daughter, Mary.

Burnett died in Grahamstown, South Africa, on 23 August 1994.

== Church career ==
Burnett was made deacon in 1946 and ordained priest in 1947. He served as chaplain at Michaelhouse from 1950 to 1954. He was vicar of Ladysmith 1954- 57. In 1957 he was consecrated as Bishop of Bloemfontein and served there until 1967; he was General Secretary of the South African Council of Churches 1967–69; Assistant Bishop of Johannesburg 1967–69; Bishop of Grahamstown 1969–74; Archbishop of Cape Town and Metropolitan for Southern Africa 1974–81.

He became Anglican Bishop of Bloemfontein in 1957, and later served as the first general secretary of the South African Council of Churches when it was formed in 1967 from the old Christian Council of South Africa. In 1969 he became Bishop of Grahamstown, and was Archbishop of Cape Town from 1974 – 1981.

During his time as Bishop of Grahamstown he became involved in the charismatic renewal movement in the Anglican Church.

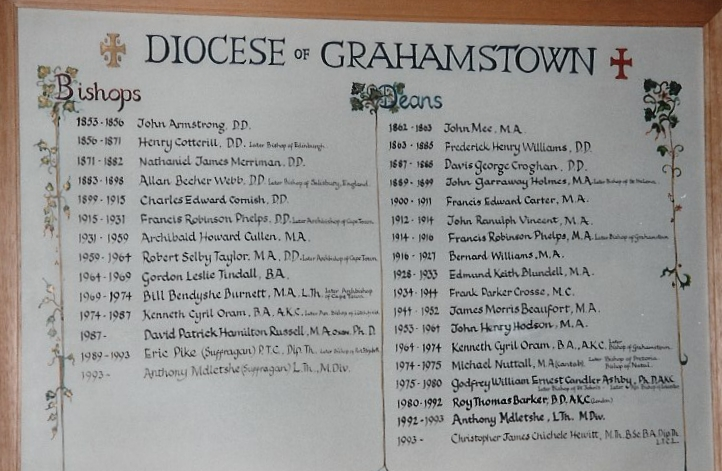
Chart showing the bishops and deans from the Cathedral of St. Michael and St. George, Grahamstown, South Africa.

== Apartheid ==
The English speaking churches in South Africa were the focus of a strong opposition to Apartheid during the 1960s and 1970s, though they did not move from protest to resistance as a whole. In the 1960s, there was a movement to create groups within the Christian church which would stand up for the rights of those oppressed. Groups which would be focal points of Christian resistance. There was opposition within the Christian community in South Africa, wherein the Dutch Reformed Churches attacked this new approach as though it were a new denomination. The Dutch Reformed Church had traditionally been closely connected to the government in power, the National Party. Burnett, at that time the General Secretary of the South African Council of Churches, said at a synod meeting in Grahamstown that because of his position he could not lead such a movement but if nobody else tried to get it going he might consider doing so.

However, in 1979, Burnett was the Archbishop of Cape Town and thus president of the Anglican Provincial Synod and once again, he voiced a challenge to the Synod.

There was a rather long and waffling motion being debated by the Synod about the permits that the government required the church to apply for. Burnett spoke from the chair, saying that he disliked having to apply for permits, but he thought it was part of his role in keeping the institutional church going. He was quite prepared to see the institutional church die, and if that was what synod really wanted him to do, he would do it. It was a challenge to the synod to "think sect", based on the same kind of thinking as in the earlier "Obedience to God" movement. It was a challenge to the synod to move beyond passing resolutions, and to actually act on its principles. The synod failed to meet the challenge, and Burnett retired before the next one met.

The press picked it up, and if the synod had not resolved to play it safe, it might have been a very different story. There was no resolution to this effect that was minuted. Burnett's direct challenge was met by embarrassed silence and evasion; and at that moment the synod, black members as well as white, showed itself to be indeed trapped in apartheid. Burnett had opened to door a chink, but the church did not want to escape from the trap.

In an article published in 1974 Time magazine said: "While the Vatican seeks to rid Catholicism of any colonial taint in Portuguese Africa, the liberal Protestant South African Council of Churches has taken a bold stand against racism in its own country. At a recent national conference, council delegates passed a strong resolution warning that racial tension in South Africa is leading to "violence and war". And if it came to this, the council added, Christians should seriously question whether they could participate in armed battle against liberation forces. The resolution reasoned that both "Catholic and Reformation theology" teach that Christians can only participate in a just war—and the requirements for a just war rule out fighting for "a basically unjust and discriminatory society". That, said the council, is a fair description of South Africa. The resolution noted that South Africa's Dutch-descended Afrikaners themselves cited British repression as the rationale for the Boer War against Britain and argued that "the same applies to the black people in their struggle today". The resolution has been condemned in the South African Parliament and by the Dutch Reformed churches, which do not belong to the council. But the new Anglican Archbishop of Cape Town, the Rt. Rev. Bill B. Burnett, last week defended it. Said he: "It faces us with things as they are."'

== Publications ==
- Lambeth 1958 and Reunion: An Anglican Version. Grahamstown: Rhodes University. 1959.
- The Rock that is Higher Than I: The Autobiography of the Right Rev Bill Bendyshe Burnett. Shiela Burnett. 1997. ISBN 978-0-86810-325-9.
- Anglicans in Natal. Durban: Churchwardens of St Paul's.
- The Missionary Work of the First Anglican Bishop of Natal, the Rt. Reverend John William Colenso, Between the Years 1852-1875. Grahamstown: Rhodes University. 1947.

Anglican Church of Southern Africa titles
Preceded by Cecil Alderson	Bishop of Bloemfontein; 1957–1967	Succeeded by Frederick Amoore
Preceded by Gordon Tindall	Bishop of Grahamstown; 1969–1974	Succeeded by Kenneth Oram
Preceded by Robert Selby Taylor	Archbishop of Cape Town; 1974–1981	Succeeded by Philip Russell
