= Henry Cotterill =

English bishop (1812–1886)

The Right Reverend Henry Cotterill
- Bishop of Edinburgh
- Church: Scottish Episcopal Church
- In office: 1872–1886
- Predecessor: Charles Terrot
- Successor: John Dowden
- Other posts: Bishop of Grahamstown (1856–1871) bishop coadjutor of Edinburgh (1871–1872)

Orders
- Ordination: 1836
- Consecration: 1856

Personal details
- Born: 1812 Ampton, Suffolk, England
- Died: 16 April 1886 Edinburgh, Edinburghshire, Scotland

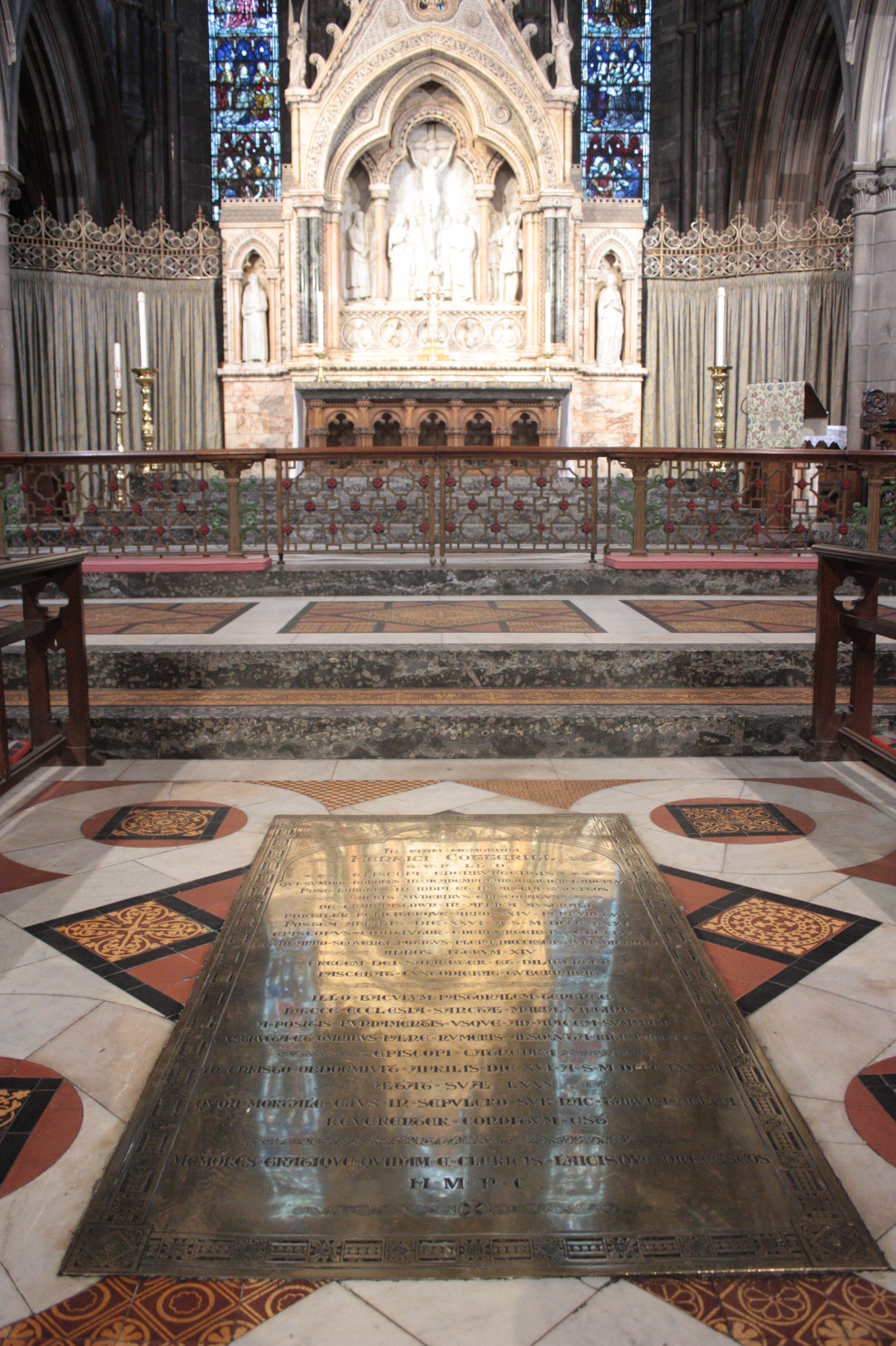
Henry Cotterill's grave in St Mary's Episcopal Cathedral, Edinburgh

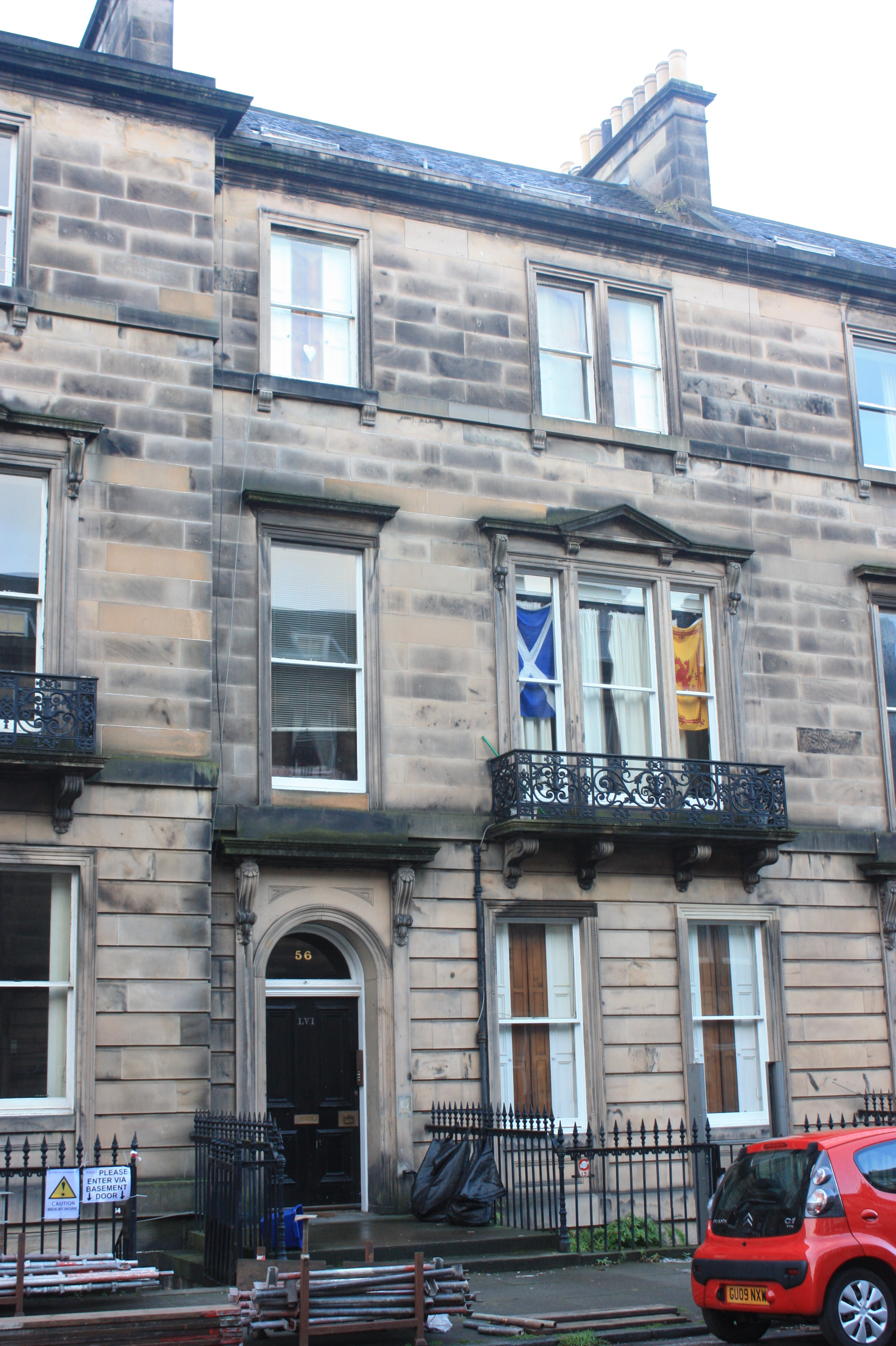
Cotterill's house at 56 Manor Place, Edinburgh

Henry Cotterill FRSE (1812 – 16 April 1886) was an Anglican bishop, serving as Bishop of Grahamstown, South Africa from 1856 to 1871, and as Bishop of Edinburgh in the Scottish Episcopal Church from 1872 until his death.

== Early life ==
Cotterill was born in Ampton in 1812 into an ecclesiastical family of committed Church Evangelicals. His father, Joseph Cotterill (1780 – 1858), was Rector of Blakeney, Norfolk, and a prebendary of Norwich Cathedral. His mother, Anne Boak, was a close friend of Hannah More. Educated at his father's old college, St John's College, Cambridge, he was both Senior Wrangler and headed the list of Classicists in 1835, on the strength of which he was elected as a Fellow of his college. Influenced by Charles Simeon, he was ordained in 1836 and went to India as Chaplain to the Madras Presidency the following year. Forced by malaria to return to England in 1846, he became inaugural Vice Principal and then the second Principal of Brighton College. In post less than six years, he reinvigorated the languishing infant school. In a whirlwind of energetic reform, he overhauled the curriculum by introducing the teaching of the sciences and oriental languages, restored discipline, launched a fund to build a chapel, built the first on-site boarding house and connected the school to the town's gas supply.

== Bishop of Grahamstown ==
At the suggestion of Anthony Ashley-Cooper, 7th Earl of Shaftesbury and John Sumner, Archbishop of Canterbury, he was nominated and consecrated in 1856 as the second colonial Bishop of Grahamstown in South Africa. As was then customary, he was simultaneously created a Doctor of Divinity (DD).

Cotterill was consecrated on 23 November 1856, and arrived in Grahamstown in May 1857. Bishop Cotterill's episcopate was occupied with the development and consolidation of his diocese, and with the institution of diocesan and provincial synods. The opening service of the first synod of the diocese was held in the Grahamstown Cathedral on 20 June 1860. It may be of interest to record that H. Blaine and F. Carlisle were the representatives of the Cathedral congregation at the synod.

As one of the bishops of South Africa, he sat in judgement in December 1863 on John Colenso, Bishop of Natal, his college friend from Cambridge days.

== Translation to Edinburgh ==
He was translated to Edinburgh in 1871 as coadjutor bishop of the Scottish Episcopal Church, and was created a full diocesan bishop in 1872.

During his time in Edinburgh he resided at 10 North Manor Place (later renumbered as 56 Manor Place), just north of his place of worship St Mary's Cathedral.

From 1875 to 1881, he served as one of the founding Council members of the Cockburn Association, a campaigning conservation group established in 1875 to protect and preserve Edinburgh's built and natural heritage.

He died in post in Edinburgh in 1886 and was buried between the choir stalls in the cathedral. His grave is covered by a large memorial brass made by Francis Skidmore of Coventry.

== Family life ==
In 1836 he married Anna Isabella Parnther (1812-1899) who had been born in Jamaica.

They had at least two daughters and four sons. The four boys all attended Brighton College. George Edward (1839 – 1913), a Cambridge cricket blue and Sussex cricketer, was briefly Headmaster of St. Andrew's College, Grahamstown (1863 – 65) before returning to teach at Brighton College (1865 – 81). Henry Bernard (1846 – 1924) was an African missionary explorer and writer. Joseph Montagu Cotterill (1851 – 1933) played cricket for Sussex and became President of the Royal College of Surgeons of Edinburgh and was knighted. Arthur John (1849 – 1915) was Engineer-in-Chief, Egyptian Railways.

His brother George was on the teaching staff of Brighton College 1849 – 51 before emigrating to New Zealand while, intriguingly, his youngest brother, James Henry, was a pupil at the school while he was the Principal. James Henry became Professor of Applied Mathematics at the Royal Naval College, Greenwich (1873 – 97) and was elected a Fellow of the Royal Society in 1878.

== Published works ==
His published works include

- Does Science Aid Faith in Regard to Creation?. Kessinger Publishing. 2010. ISBN 978-1-164-62331-1.
- The Genesis of the Church. William Blackwood and Sons. 1872.
- The Seven Ages of the Church; Or, the Seven Apocalyptic Epistles Interpreted by Church History. George Bell. 1849.
- A Letter on the Present Position of the South African Church. Bell & Daldy. 1865.
- Revealed Religion Expounded by Its Relations to the Moral Being of God. Kessinger Publishing. 2010. ISBN 978-1-166-94841-2.
- My Work for God. Kessinger Publishing. 2010. ISBN 978-1-166-57964-7.
- On the True Relations of Scientific Thought and Religious Belief. Hardwicke & Bogue. 1878.

== Sources ==
- Cotton, George Edward Lynch (1856). The true strength and mission of the church : a sermon. London: Rivingtons.
- Craik, Alex D. D. (2008). Mr Hopkins' Men: Cambridge Reform and British Mathematics in the 19th Century. Springer. ISBN 978-1-84628-791-6.
- Hefling, Charles; Shattuck, Cynthia (2008). The Oxford Guide to the Book of Common Prayer A Worldwide Survey. Oxford University Press, USA. ISBN 978-0-19-529762-1.
- Jones, Martin D. W. (1995). Brighton College, 1845 – 1995. Phillimore. ISBN 978-0-85033-978-9.
- Neale, Charles Montague (1907). The senior wranglers of the University of Cambridge, from 1748 to 1907. With biographical, & c., notes. Bury St. Edmunds: Groom and Son.
- Nutter, Charles S. (1911). The Hymns and Hymn Writers of the Church. Nashville, New York and Cincinnati: Eaton & Mains, Jennings &. Graham, Smith & Lamar.
- Waterston, C D; Macmillan Shearer, A (July 2006), Biographical Index of Former Fellows of the Royal Society of Edinburgh 1783 – 2002 (PDF), Edinburgh: The Royal Society of Edinburgh, archived from the original (PDF) on 24 January 2013

Anglican Church of Southern Africa titles
Preceded by John Armstrong	Bishop of Grahamstown; 1856–1871	Succeeded by Nathaniel Merriman
Scottish Episcopal Church titles
Preceded by Charles Terrot	Bishop of Edinburgh; 1871–1886	Succeeded by John Dowden
