= Mazwi Tisani =

South African Anglican bishop:

Mazwi Tisani is a South African Anglican bishop: he was the inaugural Bishop of Ukhahlamba serving from 2009 to 2017.

== Notes ==
Anglican Church of Southern Africa titles
Preceded by Inaugural appointment	Bishop of Ukhahlamba; 209 –2017	Succeeded by Moses Thozamile Madywabe
