= Thabo Makgoba =

South African Anglican bishop

The Most Reverend Thabo Makgoba KStJ
- Archbishop of Cape Town, Primate of the Anglican Church of Southern Africa
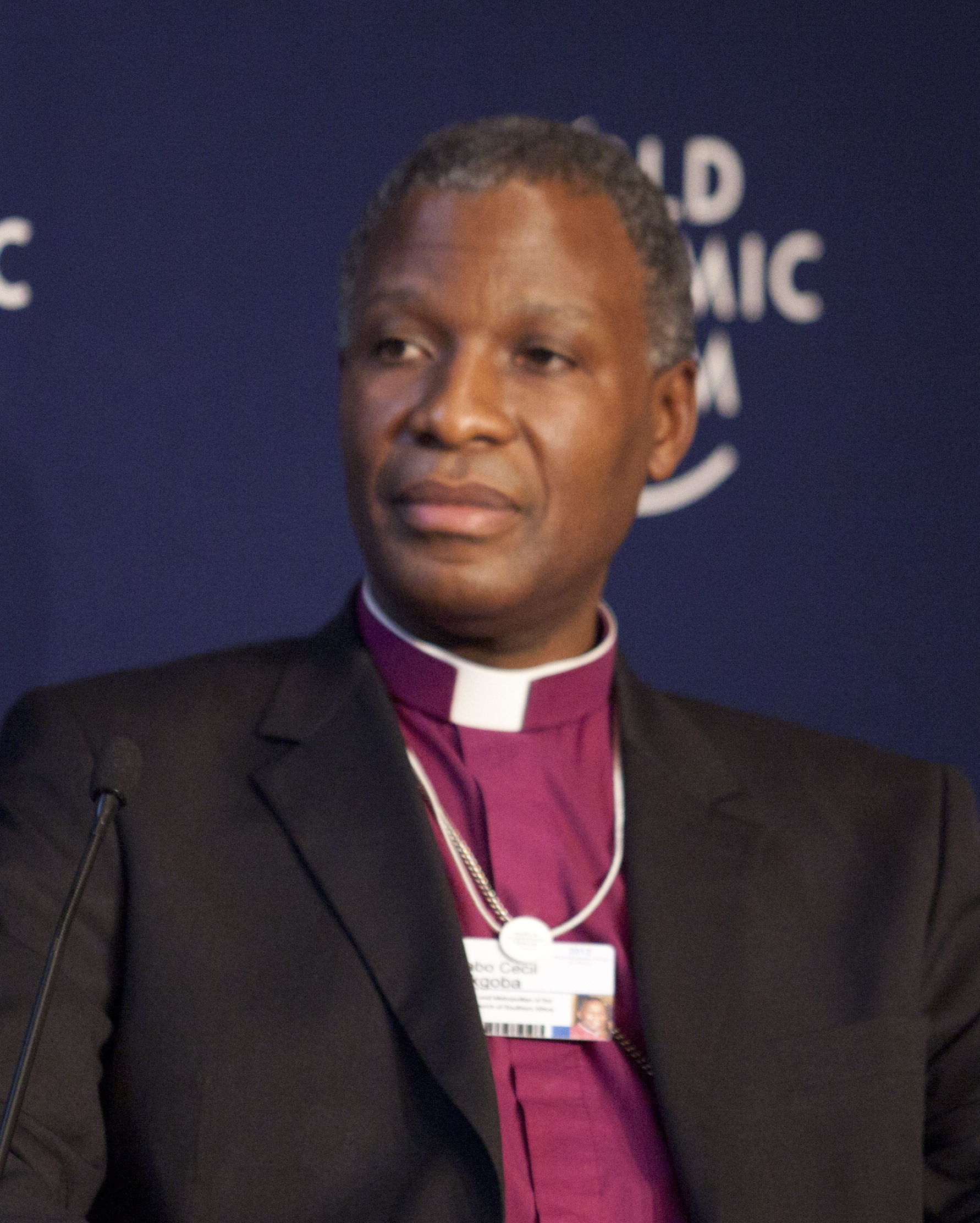
- Makgoba at the 2012 World Economic Forum on Africa
- Church: Anglican
- See: Cape Town
- Installed: 31 December 2007
- Predecessor: Njongonkulu Ndungane
- Previous post: Bishop of Grahamstown

Orders
- Ordination: 1990
- Consecration: 2002

Personal details
- Born: 15 December 1960 (age 65) Alexandra, Johannesburg, Union of South Africa

Thabo Cecil Makgoba KStJ (born 15 December 1960) is the South African Anglican archbishop of Cape Town. He had served before as bishop of Grahamstown.

== Biography ==
Makgoba graduated from Orlando High, Soweto, and completed his BSc degree at Wits University before going to St Paul's College, Grahamstown, to study for the Anglican ministry. He married Lungelwa Manona. Since then he obtained an MEd degree in Educational Psychology at Wits, where he also lectured part-time from 1993 to 1996. He was made bishop of Queenstown (a suffragan bishop in the Diocese of Grahamstown) on 25 May 2002 and became the diocesan bishop of Grahamstown (in Makhanda) in 2004.

Until he moved to the Diocese of Grahamstown as bishop suffragan, Makgoba's ministry had been spent in the Diocese of Johannesburg, first as a curate at St Mary's Cathedral, Johannesburg, and then as the Anglican chaplain at Wits University. After that he was made rector of St Alban's Church, Ferrairasdorp, Johannesburg, (Note: St Alban's Church, Ferrairasdorp 26°12′33″S 28°02′06″E) and later of Christ the King, Sophiatown. (Note: Christ the King, Sophiatown 26°10′25″S 27°58′38″E) He became archdeacon of Sophiatown in 1999. He became archbishop of Cape Town on 31 December 2007, the youngest person ever to be elected to this position. He was a Procter Fellow of the Episcopal Divinity School in the United States in 2008.

As of 2012, Makgoba is currently the chancellor of the University of the Western Cape.

Makgoba graduated with a PhD degree from the University of Cape Town in December 2009. He was awarded the Ernest Oppenheimer Memorial Trust Scholarship to study for his doctorate. He is also an Associate at the Allan Gray School for Values at UCT.

== Views ==
Makgoba believes that 'We must each ask, "Who is my neighbour?" and then treat every individual and our whole global community in ways that uphold the sanctity of life, the dignity of humanity in all our differences, and the integrity of creation. These are our touchstones as we follow God's call for social justice here and now.'

Makgoba is open to discussions on the orthodox Anglican stance on homosexuality. The Anglican Diocese of Cape Town, after a Synod held in Cape Town, on 20–22 August 2009, passed a resolution calling the Anglican Church in Southern Africa bishops to give pastoral guidelines for homosexual couples living in "covenanted partnerships". At the same time, it was approved an amendment for the resolution which provided that the guidelines "due regard of the mind of the Anglican Communion." Makgoba stated that the resolution was "an important first step to saying: 'Lord, how do we do ministry in this context?' I'm a developmental person. I don't believe in big bangs. If you throw a little pebble into water, it sends out concentric circles and hopefully that way change comes from that." He also said that "South Africa has laws that approve a civil union in this context, but not in the other countries within our province. In central Africa and north Africa, both the Anglican Church and the state say 'no'" and "The reason for this resolution was because we have these parishioners, and the law provides for them to be in that state, so how do we pastorally respond to that?"

In 2016 Makgoba stated he was "pained" after a church synod rejected a proposal to allow bishops to license gay and lesbian clergy who are in same sex civil marriages to minister in parishes and rejected a motion to provide for prayers of blessing to be offered for those in same sex civil marriages. After the synod, which covered churches from Angola, Lesotho, Mozambique, Namibia, South Africa, St Helena, and Swaziland, Makgoba advised "our lesbian sisters and gay brothers: I was deeply pained by the outcome of the debate". In 2023, after the Synod of bishops rejected a proposal to bless same-sex unions, the bishops voted for Makgoba's proposal to draft prayers that can be said pastorally with same-sex couples. In 2024, Makgoba supported the blessing of same-sex couples in civil unions and spoke in favour of two such proposals at the Provincial Synod; after the Synod rejected the two proposals, Makgoba said, "I had hoped that we would take a decision to incorporate all God's people, regardless of their sexuality." In 2026, again at the Provincial Synod, Makgoba endorsed proposals to offer prayers of blessing for same-sex couples.

== Political statements ==
Like his predecessors, he has used his position to make political statements about current affairs. In October 2009, he supported Bishop Rubin Phillip's condemnation of the violence at Kennedy Road informal settlement in which a local militia "acted with the support of the local ANC structures".

== Awards ==
- Cross of St Augustine in 2008, the second highest international award for outstanding service to the Anglican Communion, by the Archbishop of Canterbury.
- Seven honorary doctorates in divinity, from the General Theological Seminary (2009) and Huron University College ( 2013). Sewanee: The University of the South (2015). Honorary doctorate in literature from Witwatersrand University (2016). Received the Chancellor's medal University of Pretoria (2015). Honorary doctorate in Divinity University of Stellenbosch (2018). Honorary degree in divinity from Amherst College (2019). Honorary degree in divinity from Berkeley Divinity School (2021).
- Knight of Justice of the Most Venerable Order of Saint John

He was created a Companion of the Roll of Honour of the Memorial of Merit of King Charles the Martyr in 2019.

== Works ==
- Faith and Courage- Praying with Nelson Mandela (2018)
- Workplace Spirituality (2012)
- Connectedness (2005)

== Notes ==
Anglican Church of Southern Africa titles
Preceded by David Russell	Bishop of Grahamstown; 2004–2007	Succeeded by Ebenezer St Mark Ntlali
Preceded by Njongonkulu Ndungane	Anglican Archbishop of Cape Town; 2007 -	Incumbent
