= Diocese of Ukhahlamba =

The Diocese of Khahlamba is a diocese in the Anglican Church of Southern Africa.

== History ==
In 2009 the Diocese of Grahamstown was divided and the Diocese of Ukhahlamba sprung from that division. The bishop of the diocese was Moses Madywabe. The mother church of the diocese is the Cathedral of St Michael and All Angels in Queenstown, Eastern Cape. Siyabonga Sibeko is the second dean of the diocese and the rector of the cathedral parish.

== List of bishops ==
- Mazwi Ernest Tisani 2009 - 2017
- Moses Thozamile Madywabe 2018 - 2023
- Siyabonga Sibeko 2024
