= Southwell, South Africa =

Southwell
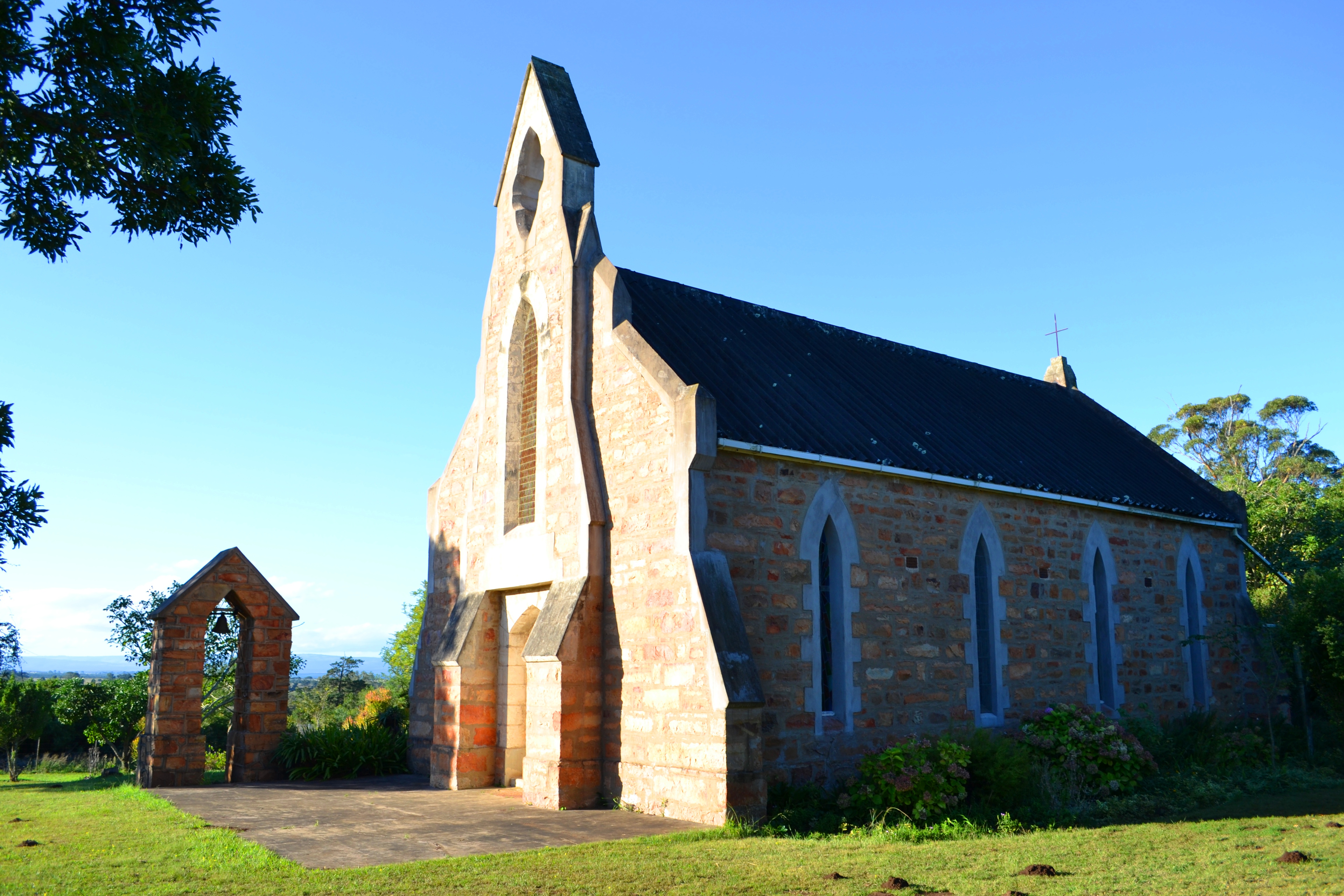
- St James Anglican Church, Southwell

- Location within Eastern Cape Location within South Africa
- Coordinates: 33°32′09″S 26°41′19″E
- Country: South Africa
- Province: Eastern Cape
- District: Sarah Baartman
- Municipality: Ndlambe
- Time zone: UTC+2 (SAST)

Southwell is a settlement within the former farming district of the same name, about 23 kilometres (14 mi) from Port Alfred and about 35 kilometres (22 mi) from Grahamstown.

Established in 1849 as a mission station, it was located at Lombard's Post, a fortified farmhouse originally granted to Pieter Lombard in 1790 as a leningsplaas (loan farm). Canon Henry Waters was the first resident minister.

In the mid-19th century it hosted a Xhosa school, which was closed down during Mlanjeni's War.

The local St James Anglican Church was built in 1870. The foundation stone was laid by Nathaniel Merriman, Archdeacon of Grahamstown.

In 1925 a survey was done for a railway branch from Martindale to Southwell. The railway was never built.
