= Bishop of Table Bay =

Suffragan bishop in the Anglican Church of Southern Africa

The bishop of Table Bay is a suffragan bishop in the Anglican Diocese of Cape Town. Since 2020 the incumbent has been the Right Reverend Joshua Louw. Like the bishop of Dover the incumbent is in effect the diocesan bishop as their superior is primate of an ecclesiastical province.

According to the canons of the Anglican Church of Southern Africa, the bishop of Table Bay has the rights and powers of a diocesan bishop, and is responsible for the day-to-day running of the Diocese of Cape Town.

== List of bishops ==
- Garth Counsell 2004–2020
- Joshua Louw 2020–present
