= Moses Madywabe =

Moses Madywabe was a South African Anglican bishop: he had been the Bishop of Ukhahlamba since 2018 until his death on 20 June 2023.

Bishop Moses died on the 20th of June 2023 in the local hospital.

== Notes ==
Anglican Church of Southern Africa titles
Preceded by Mazwi Tisani	Bishop of Ukhahlamba; 2018 - 2023	Incumbent
