= Jack Cunningham (bishop) =

Jack Cunningham OBE (1 September 1926 – 18 October 1978) was the first Anglican Bishop of Central Zambia.

Educated at Queen Elizabeth Grammar School, Wakefield and Edinburgh Theological College he was ordained in 1953. He was a Curate at St Mark with St Barnabas, Coventry then held incumbencies at St Thomas and St Alban in the same city. In 1967 he emigrated to Zambia where he was Priest in charge of St Michael, Kitwe before his appointment to the episcopate. He confirmed the present bishop of the diocese Derek Kamukwamba.

He was appointed OBE in the 1978 New Year Honours.

Anglican Communion titles
New title	Bishop of Central Zambia; 1971–1978	Succeeded by Robert Selby Taylor
