= David Russell (bishop) =

South African Anglican bishop (1938–2014)

The Right Reverend David Russell
- Bishop of Grahamstown
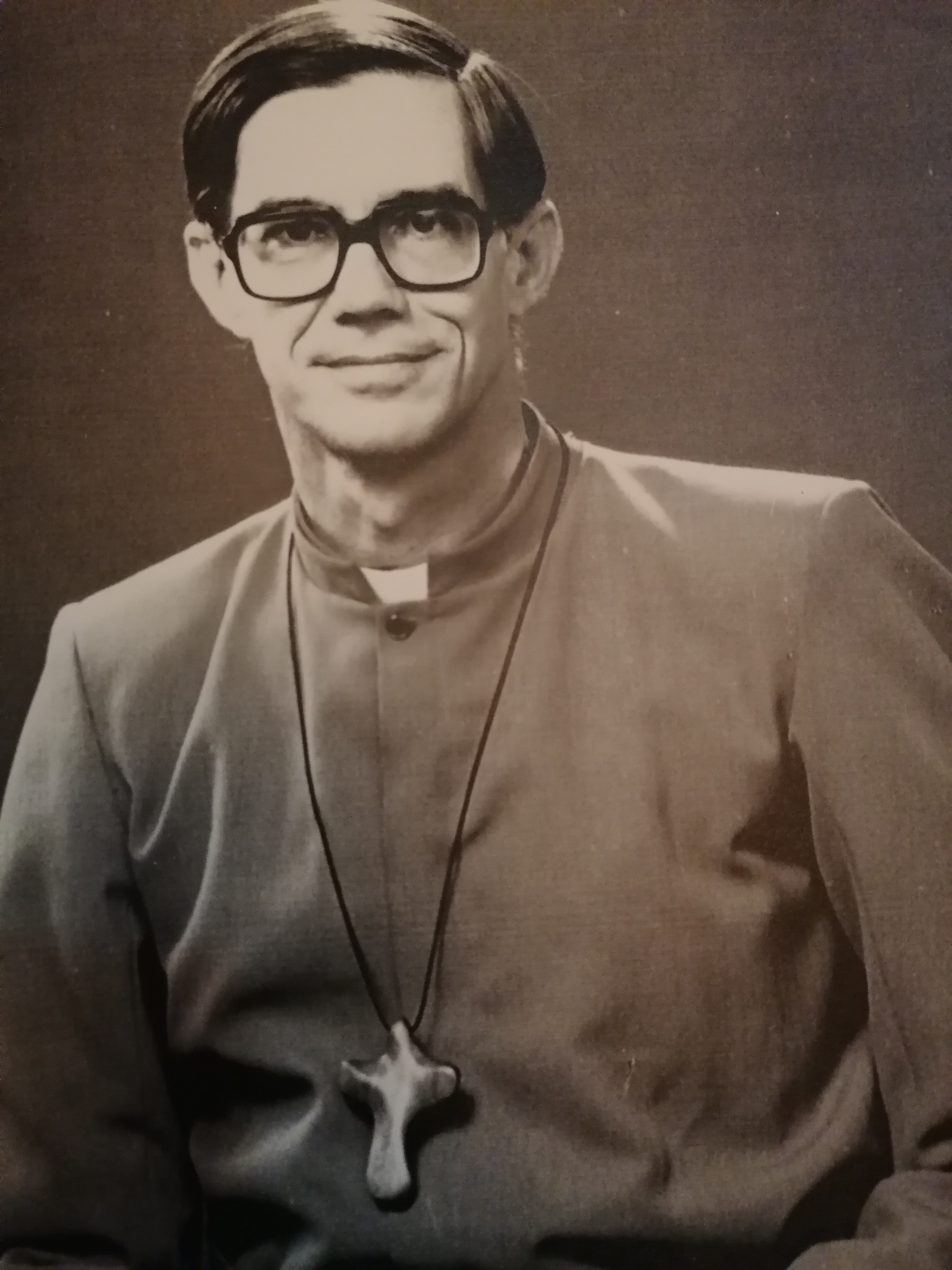
- Diocese: Diocese of Grahamstown
- In office: 1987–2004
- Predecessor: Kenneth Oram
- Successor: Thabo Makgoba

Orders
- Ordination: 1965
- Consecration: 1986

Personal details
- Born: 6 November 1938
- Died: 17 August 2014 (aged 75) Cape Town, South Africa

David Patrick Hamilton Russell (6 November 1938 – 17 August 2014) was a South African Anglican bishop.

== Life and ministry ==
Russell was educated at the University of Cape Town. Ordained in 1965, he was a chaplain to migrant workers. From 1975 to 1986 he was banned and house arrested by the South African Apartheid Government.

He was a suffragan bishop in the Diocese of St John's (now the Diocese of Mthatha) from 1986 to 1987 and then Bishop of Grahamstown until 2004.

Having been born in the late 1930s, Russell got immersed in the struggle against apartheid from an early age. He did his first degree at the University of Cape Town, and then studied for an MA at Oxford University. He did his training for the priesthood at the College of the Resurrection, Mirfield, England. He later obtained his PhD in Religious Studies (specialising in Christian Ethics) from the University of Cape Town.

== Anti-apartheid activism ==
A lifelong activist, Russell, who died on 17 August 2014 after a long battle with cancer, was a friend of Steve Biko and many others fighting apartheid. His support assisted the Black Consciousness Movement in carrying out a number of projects, particularly those facilitated by the Black Community Programmes.

Among Russell’s many acts of defiance was when on 8 August 1977 he laid down in front of trucks and bulldozers to protest against forced removals from Modderdam in the Western Cape, an area declared "whites only". He was forcibly dragged by police and arrested as an “enemy of the state”. The apartheid regime served him with a five-year banning order in October 1977 restricting him to Cape Town.

Defying these banning orders, and found in possession of a book – Biko – by Donald Woods, he was sentenced in 1980 to a one-year jail sentence. He denounced apartheid injustices and the arrests of anti-apartheid activists as vicious and pointed out that such kind of injustices filled people with “revulsion, bitterness and anger”.

Later in life, Russell was a founding member of the Steve Biko Foundation’s Board of Trustees and served in this role from 1998 - 2009. In recognition of his contribution to the liberation struggle and ongoing pursuit of social justice, Russell was nominated for a national order by the Foundation, and subsequently conferred with the Order of Baobab in Silver by President Jacob Zuma.

Russell contributed enormously to the South African liberation struggle and development at large. He is remembered for his role in fighting apartheid. Bishop Russell was an ardent advocate of human rights and his concern for the rights of women was an important aspect of his ministry. Even in retirement, he remained an outspoken advocate for inclusivity. He was a staunch advocate for social justice and stood firmly on the side of the oppressed.

== Awards ==
On 27 April 2011, the President of South Africa, Jacob Zuma conferred the Order of the Baobab in Silver on Russell for his outstanding contribution to the theological field.

== Notes ==
Anglican Church of Southern Africa titles
Preceded by Kenneth Oram	Bishop of Grahamstown; 1987–2004	Succeeded by Thabo Makgoba
