= Robert Gray (bishop of Cape Town) =

The Right Reverend Robert Gray
- Bishop of Cape Town
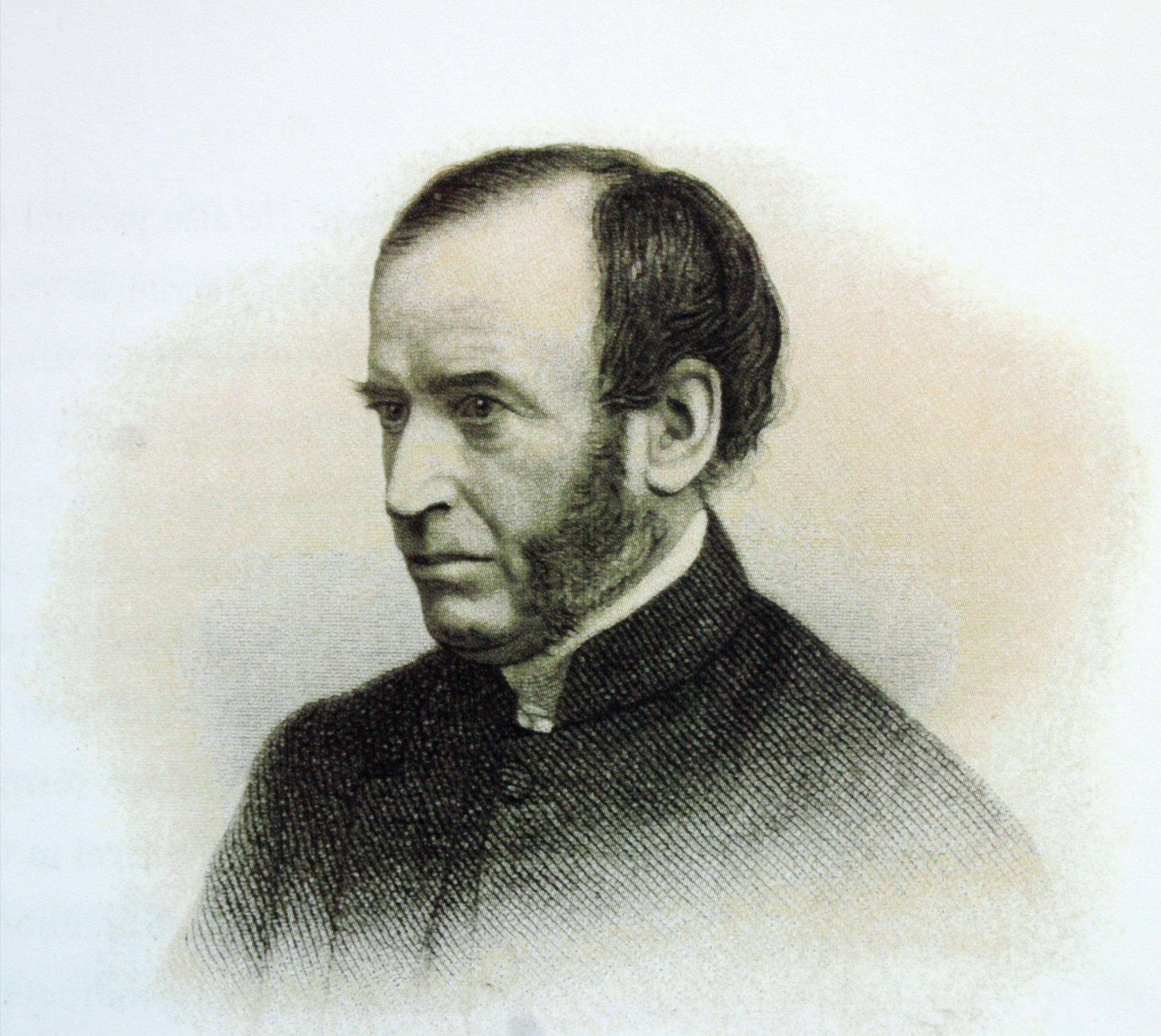
- Church: Anglican
- Province: Southern Africa
- Diocese: Cape Town

Orders
- Consecration: 1847

Personal details
- Born: 3 October 1809
- Died: 1 September 1872 (aged 62)
- Spouse: Sophy Gray (architect)

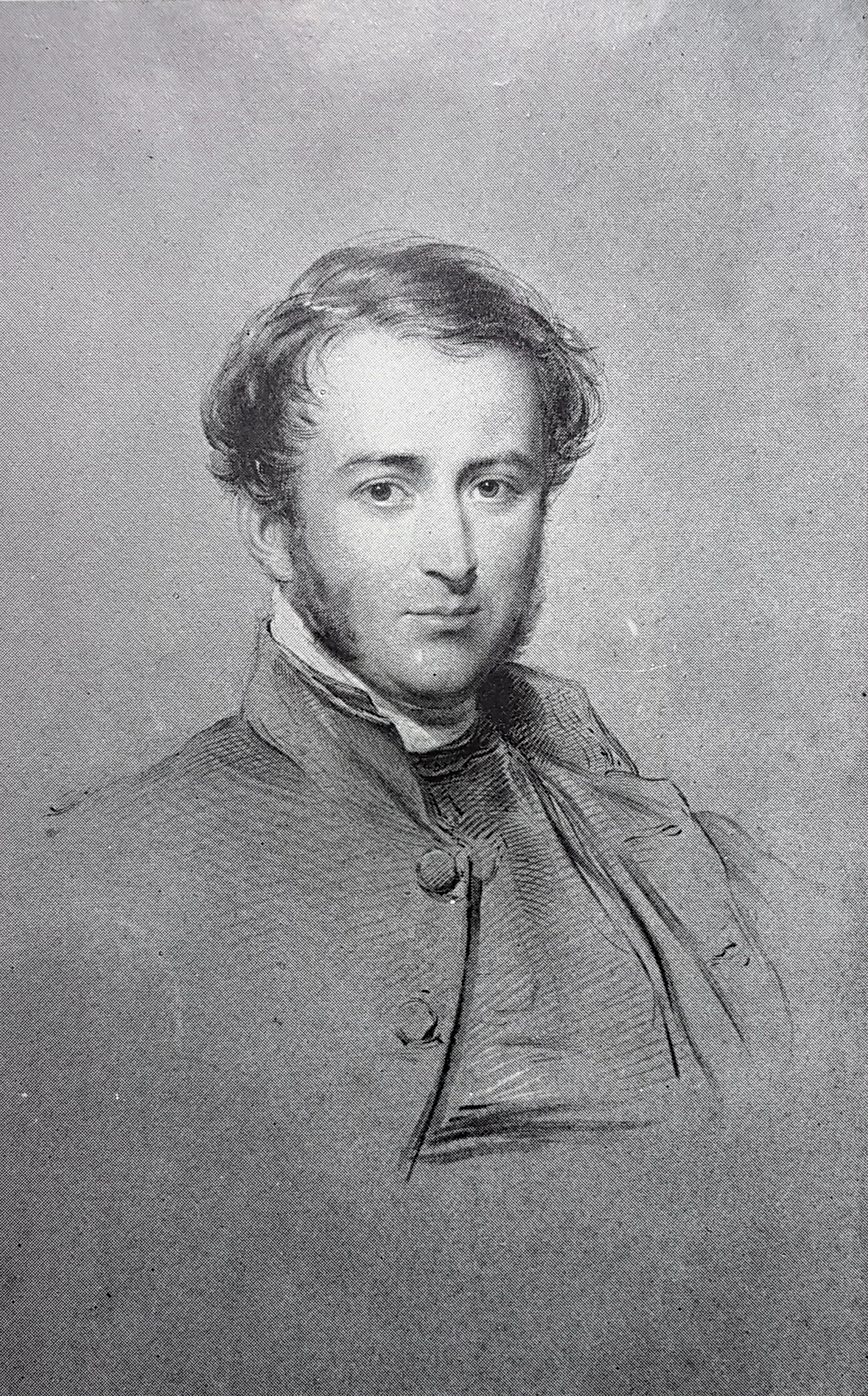
Before leaving England for Cape Town

Robert Gray (3 October 1809 – 1 September 1872) was the first Anglican Bishop of Cape Town.

== Biography ==
Gray was born in Bishopwearmouth, north east England, the 12th child and son of Robert Gray, Bishop of Bristol, who made him deacon in Wells Cathedral on 11 January 1834. His first parish was at Whitworth. In 1845 he became the vicar of Stockton-on-Tees. As a priest he was interested in mission, and was local secretary for the Society for the Propagation of the Gospel in Foreign Parts.

In 1847, he was consecrated Bishop of Cape Town in Westminster Abbey, along with three bishops for Australia, and arrived in his diocese, the boundaries of which were undefined, in February the following year.

Soon after arriving he set out on a journey to explore his diocese, accompanied by James Green, who was to be rector of Pietermaritzburg in the Colony of Natal. On reaching Grahamstown he ordained William Long, with whom he was to come into conflict later.

In 1849, he visited St Helena, and in 1850 set out on another tour of the mainland, reaching as far as Pietermaritzburg. This journey convinced him that the division of the diocese was necessary. He returned to England to arrange for this, and in 1853 he resigned his diocese and received fresh letters patent for a smaller Anglican Diocese of Cape Town, while two new bishops were consecrated: John William Colenso as Bishop of Natal and John Armstrong as Bishop of Grahamstown.

Robert Gray was married on 6 September 1836 to Sophy Myddleton, the daughter of country squire Richard Wharton Myddleton of Durham and Yorkshire, and founded St George's Grammar School, in 1848 in the shadow of the St. George's Cathedral and Diocesan College, or Bishops as it is commonly known, in Rondebosch, Cape Town, in 1849. A notable part of his life concerned his feud with Colenso about Colenso's alleged heretical opinions. Gray and his wife looked after the children of Sandile kaNgqika, including his daughter Emma, aiming to provide influence over the Gaika people.

Robert Gray's son, the Rev. Charles Norris Gray, M.A., edited the book 'Life of Robert Gray' (Rivingtons, 1876).

== Notes ==
Anglican Church of Southern Africa titles
New diocese	Bishop of Cape Town; 1847 - 1872	Succeeded by William West Jones
