= Clement Shaba =

Anglican Bishop of Central Zambia

William Clement Hlanya Shaba (known as "Clement Shaba", 1926 – September 2008) was a former Anglican Bishop of Central Zambia. Born in 1926, he trained for the Priesthood at St John's Seminary, Lusaka and was ordained in 1965. After service as a priest in Northern Zambia he was appointed Dean of Mufulira Cathedral. He died in September 2008.

While Shaba was generally called "Clement Shaba", he may have held the legal surname "Hlanya Shaba" or "Hlanya-Shaba".
