= Nathaniel Merriman =

South African bishop (1809–1882)

The Rt Rev'd Nathaniel James Merriman D.D.
- Bishop of Grahamstown
- Church: Anglican
- Diocese: Grahamstown
- In office: 1871 – 1882
- Predecessor: Henry Cotterill
- Successor: Alan Becher Webb
- Previous post: Dean of Cape Town

Orders
- Ordination: 1833

Personal details
- Born: 4 April 1809
- Died: 16 August 1882 (aged 73)

Nathaniel James Merriman (4 April 1809 – 15 August 1882) was the third Bishop of Grahamstown from 1871 until his death.

He was educated at Winchester College and Brasenose College, Oxford; and ordained in 1833. He was curate then Vicar of Street, Somerset until he emigrated to South Africa. He rose to become Archdeacon of Grahamstown then Dean of Cape Town before being elevated the Episcopate.

Conflict arose between Merriman, who was at this time the Bishop of Grahamstown and Frederick Williams, Dean of Grahamstown regarding the status of the Church of the Province of Southern Africa versus the Church of England and the validity of the appointments of bishops. Dean Williams then excluded Bishop Merriman from his Cathedral. This action resulted in many court cases which Williams won.

== Family ==
His son, John X. Merriman, was the last prime minister of the Cape Colony before the formation of the Union of South Africa in 1910. Frederick Merriman, the New Zealand politician was Nathaniel's brother.

He died on 15 August 1882 by being thrown from his carriage "with great violence"

== Publications ==
- The Kafirs, the Hottentot, and the Frontier Framers: Passages of Missionary Life from the Journals. George Bell. 1853.
- Shakspeare, As Bearing on English History, Graham's Town: The Committee of the General Institute, 1858
- The Cape Journals of Archdeacon N. J. Merriman, 1848-1855. The Van Riebeeck Society. 1957.

== Notes and references ==
- Harris, Charles Alexander (1885–1900). "Merriman, Nathaniel James" . Dictionary of National Biography. London: Smith, Elder & Co.
- Jan Cooper (2011). "Nathaniel James Merriman". Welcome to the Worldwide Greathead family my One-Name Study. Jan Cooper (née Greathead), near Guildford, Surrey, England.
- "Obituary". The Times. No. 30589. 18 August 1882. p. 8 col C.
- Gould, Charles; Eve, Jeanette (2011). Grahamstown Cathedral: A Guide and Short History. Grahamstown Diocesan Registry. pp. A:24.
- Valley, D. H. (2013). "Bishop Nathaniel James Merriman". South African History Online. South African History Online.
- "Funeral of Mr. F. W. Merriman". Daily Southern Cross. Vol. XXI, no. 2499. 24 July 1865. p. 4.
- Chidester, David (2014). Religions of South Africa. Routledge. ISBN 978-1-317-64987-8.
- Goedhals, Mary Mandeville (1982). Nathaniel James Merriman, Archdeacon and Bishop 1849-1882: A Study in Church Life and Government. Grahamstown: Rhodes University.
- Cooper, Charles James (1885). The South African Church Question. The Grahamstown Judgment (New ed.). London: Geo. Barber.
- Whibley, Pauline Megan (1982). Merriman of Grahamstown. Cape Town: Timmins. ISBN 0869782320.

Anglican Church of Southern Africa titles
Preceded by Henry Cotterill	Bishop of Grahamstown; 1871 – 1882	Succeeded by Alan Becher Webb
