= Anglican Diocese of Cape Town =

Diocese of the Anglican Church of Southern Africa

Diocese of Cape Town Dioecesis Civitatis Capitis Bisdom van Kaapstad IDayosisi yaseKapa

Location
- Country: South Africa
- Ecclesiastical province: Southern Africa
- Archdeaconries: Cathedral, Athlone, Constantia, Groote Schuur, Ibongoletu, Rondebosch, Waterfront
- Coordinates: 33°55′30″S 18°25′10″E

Statistics
- Parishes: 47

Information
- Rite: Anglican
- Established: 1847
- Cathedral: St. George's Cathedral

Current leadership
- Archbishop: Thabo Makgoba, Archbishop of Cape Town
- Suffragan: Joshua Louw, Bishop of Table Bay

Website
- www.capetown.anglican.org

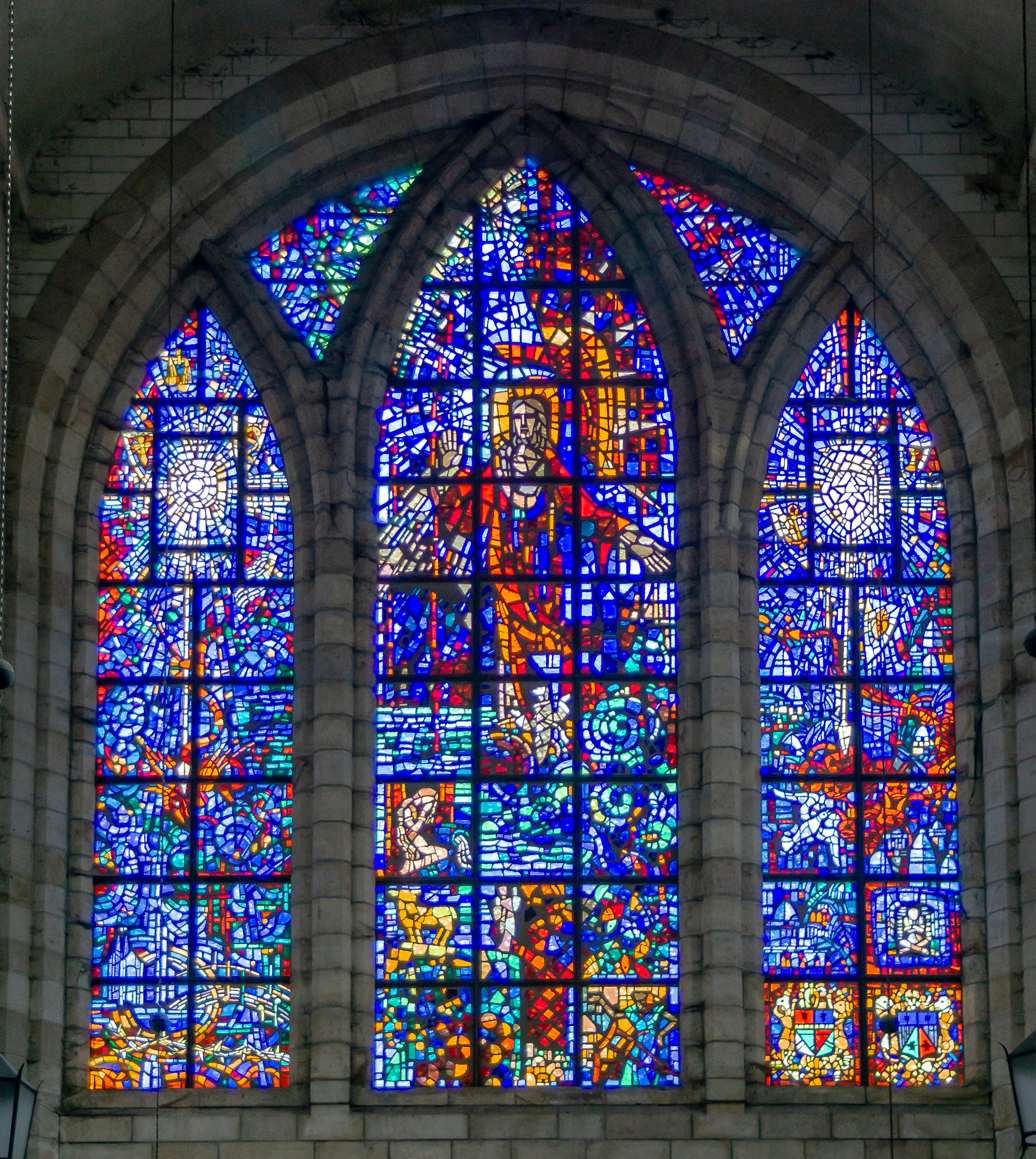
Christ in Triumph over Darkness and Evil, stained glass window by French artist Gabriel Loire in memory of Earl Mountbatten of Burma, at St. George's Cathedral, Cape Town.

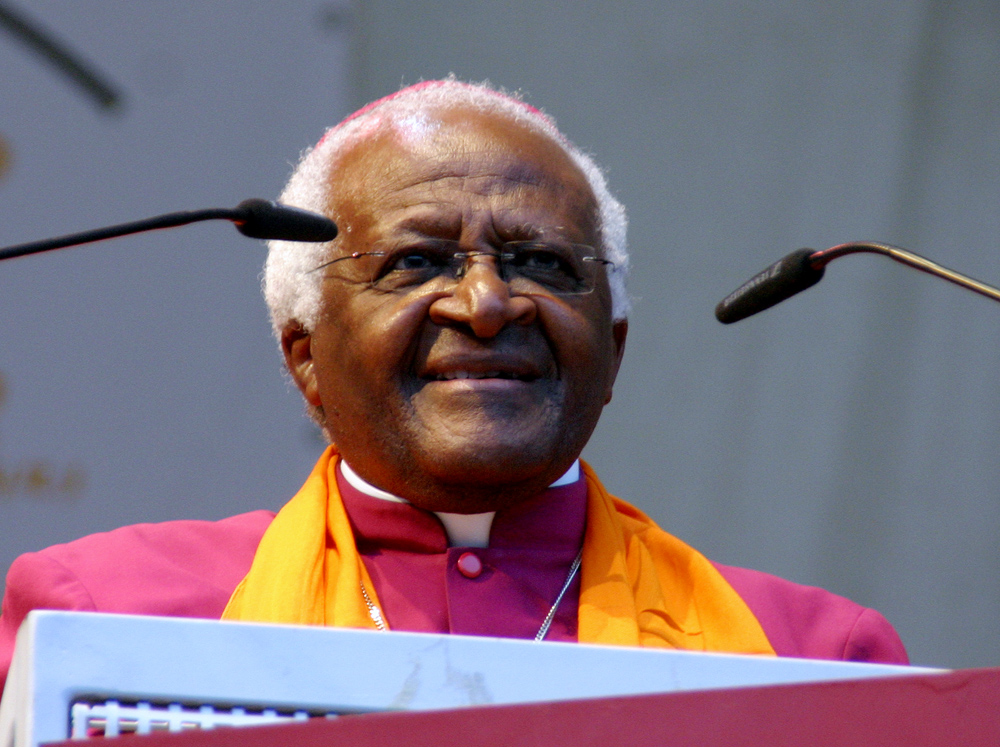
Desmond Tutu, archbishop from 1986 to 1996

The Diocese of Cape Town is a diocese of the Anglican Church of Southern Africa (ACSA) which presently covers central Cape Town, some of its suburbs and the island of Tristan da Cunha, though in the past it has covered a much larger territory. The Ordinary of the diocese is Archbishop of Cape Town and ex officio Primate and Metropolitan of the ACSA. His seat is St. George's Cathedral in Cape Town.

Desmond Tutu was archbishop from 1986 to 1996 and was archbishop-emeritus until his death in 2021. The current archbishop is Thabo Makgoba. Because of the archbishop's responsibilities as primate, many of his diocesan duties are delegated to a suffragan bishop known as the Bishop of Table Bay, an office currently held by Joshua Louw. (This is similar to the Bishop of Dover in the Church of England Diocese of Canterbury, who has held such a role since 1980.)

== History ==
The diocese came into being in 1847 with the consecration of the first bishop, Robert Gray, and was the first diocese of what was to become the Church of the Province of Southern Africa and subsequently the Anglican Church of Southern Africa. The original territory of the diocese, which had previously fallen under the Diocese of Calcutta, included the whole of Southern Africa.

In 1853, the territory was reduced by the creation of the Diocese of Grahamstown in the eastern parts of the Cape Colony and the Diocese of Natal in the Colony of Natal. In 1859, the Diocese of St Helena was created for Saint Helena and Ascension Island. In 1863, the Diocese of Bloemfontein was created, taking over all the territory north of the Orange River and the Drakensberg mountains. In 1866, J. Harries Thomas was archdeacon of Cape Town and H. Badnall, archdeacon of George; and N. J. Merriman, archdeacon of Bloemfontein (by then separated) was still a canon of Cape Town cathedral. The territory of the Cape Town diocese was further reduced in 1911 by the creation of the dioceses of George and Kimberley and Kuruman. Finally, in 2005 the diocese was divided into three, with the part to north of the city of Cape Town becoming the Diocese of Saldanha Bay and the part to the east of the city becoming the Diocese of False Bay.

== Parishes ==
- Cathedral Archdeaconry
  - Cathedral of St George the Martyr, Cape Town
- Archdeaconry of Athlone
  - St Mark the Evangelist, Athlone
  - St John, Crawford
  - St Patrick, Crawford
  - St Dominic, Hanover Park
  - The Holy Nativity, Hazendal
  - All Saints, Lansdowne
  - St Aidan, Lansdowne
  - St George the Martyr, Silvertown
- Archdeaconry of Constantia
  - St Martin, Bergvliet
  - Christ Church, Constantia
  - St Luke, Diep River
  - St Peter the Fisherman, Hout Bay
  - Christ Church, Kenilworth
  - St Philip, Kenwyn
  - Holy Spirit, Kirstenhof
  - All Saints, Plumstead
  - St Faith, Plumstead
  - St Cyprian, Retreat
  - St Andrew, Steenberg
  - Emmanuel, Wynberg
  - St John, Wynberg
- Archdeaconry of Groote Schuur
  - St Mark, Cape Town
  - St Philip, Cape Town
  - St Michael and All Angels, Observatory
  - St Luke, Salt River
  - All Saints, Woodstock
  - St Bartholomew, Woodstock
  - St Mary the Virgin, Woodstock
- Archdeaconry of Ibongoletu
  - Church of the Resurrection, Bonteheuwel
  - Eluvukweni Mission, Crossroads
  - St Columba, Guguletu
  - St Mary Magdalene, Guguletu
  - Church of the Holy Spirit, Heideveld
  - St Cyprian, Langa
  - Church of the Reconciliation, Manenberg
  - Holy Cross, Nyanga
- Archdeaconry of Rondebosch
  - Christ the King, Claremont
  - St Matthew, Claremont
  - St Saviour, Claremont
  - St Peter, Mowbray
  - St Andrew, Newlands
  - St Paul, Rondebosch
  - St Thomas, Rondebosch
- Archdeaconry of Waterfront
  - St Peter, Camps Bay
  - St Paul, Cape Town
  - Church of the Ascension, Devil's Peak Estate
  - St Barnabas, Gardens
  - Church of the Holy Redeemer, Sea Point
  - St James the Great, Sea Point
  - St Mary, Tristan da Cunha

== List of Bishops and Archbishops ==
Bishops of Cape Town
From	Until	Incumbent	Notes
1847	1873	Robert Gray	In 1853 resigned his overlarge diocese and received fresh letters patent for a new, smaller diocese.
1874	1897	William West Jones	Became Archbishop of Cape Town.
Archbishops of Cape Town
1897	1908	William West Jones	Died in office.
1909	1930	William Carter	Previously Bishop of Zululand and then of Pretoria.
1931	1938	Francis Phelps	Translated from Grahamstown; died in office.
1938	1948	Russell Darbyshire	Translated from Glasgow and Galloway; died in office.
1948	1957	Geoffrey Clayton	Translated from Johannesburg; died in office.
1957	1963	Joost de Blank	Translated from Stepney.
1964	1974	Robert Selby Taylor	Previously Bishop of Northern Rhodesia, then of Pretoria, then of Grahamstown; later Bishop of Central Zambia.
1974	1981	Bill Burnett	Previously Bishop of Bloemfontein and then of Grahamstown.
1981	1986	Philip Russell	Previously Bishop of Port Elizabeth and then of Natal.
1986	1996	Desmond Tutu	Previously Bishop of Lesotho and then of Johannesburg.
1996	2007	Njongonkulu Ndungane	Translated from Kimberley and Kuruman.
2007	present	Thabo Makgoba	Translated from Grahamstown.

== Assistant bishops ==
From 1931, Sidney Lavis was coadjutor bishop of the diocese. In 1964, Patrick Barron became an assistant bishop of the diocese.

== Schools ==
The Diocese has four diocesan schools:

- Diocesan College
- Herschel Girls' School
- St. Cyprian's School
- St. George's Grammar School

== Coat of arms ==
Diocesan arms (1952)

The diocese has borne arms since its inception. The arms, designed by Bishop Gray, combined elements of those of the dioceses of Durham (where Gray had been Bishop) and Bristol (his first chaplaincy, when his father was Bishop of Bristol) and of Baroness Burdett-Coutts, who financed the establishment of the diocese.

In their original form, the arms were : Quarterly Azure and Sable: I and IV, a lion rampant Argent; II and IV, three open crowns palewise Or; on a cross throughout Or an anchor in fess point Sable and in honour point the shield of arms of Baroness Burdett-Coutts; the shield ensigned with a Bishop's mitre proper.

The arms were revised by the College of Arms and granted in 1952. The revision consisted of replacing the Burdett-Coutts shield with a stag's head erased Gules, between the attires a pheon Azure. These arms were registered at the Bureau of Heraldry in 1968.
