= St Michael and St George Cathedral, Makhanda =

Cathedral of St Michael and St George
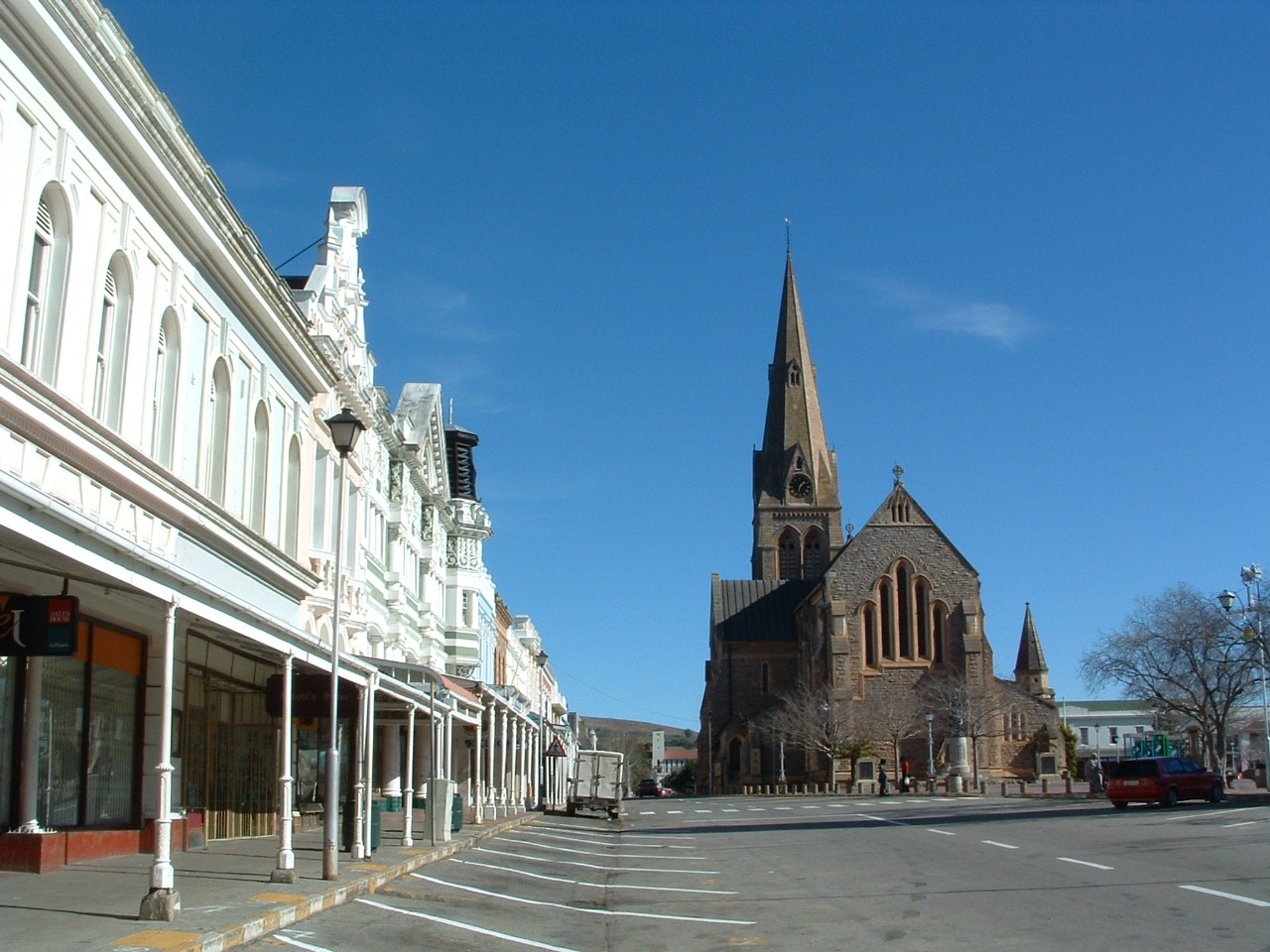
- Cathedral of St. Michael and St. George in Church Square

- Location within South Africa
- 33°18′36″S 26°31′36″E
- Location: Makhanda, Eastern Cape
- Country: South Africa
- Denomination: Anglican
- Website: grahamstowncathedral.org

History
- Founded: 1824
- Founder: John Armstrong
- Consecrated: 21 September 1850

Architecture
- Architect(s): George Gilbert Scott and John Oldrid Scott
- Style: Victorian neo-Gothic
- Completed: 1952

Specifications
- Capacity: 500
- Length: 91 feet (28 m)
- Width: 58 feet (18 m)
- Height: 60 feet (18 m)
- Materials: Stone

Administration
- Province: Southern Africa
- Diocese: Diocese of Grahamstown
- Archdeaconry: Grahamstown

Clergy
- Bishop: Vacant
- Dean: Mzinzisi Dyantyi

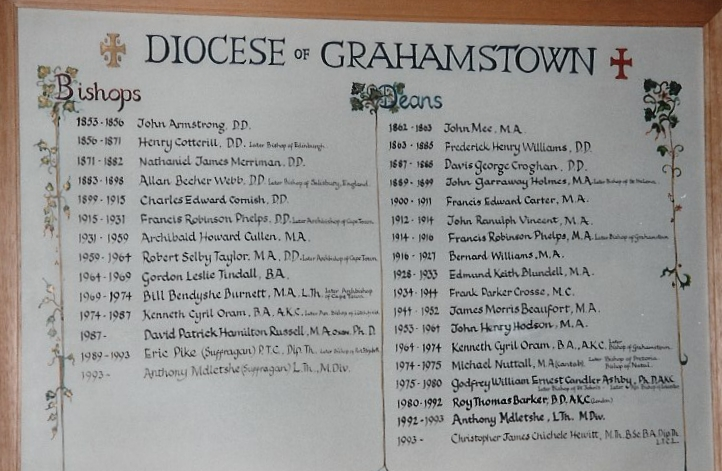
Diocesan chart showing bishops and deans of St Michael and St George Cathedral

The Cathedral of St Michael and St George is the home of the Anglican Diocese of Grahamstown in Makhanda in the Eastern Cape Province of South Africa. It is the episcopal seat of the Bishop of Grahamstown. The cathedral is located on Church Square and has the tallest spire in South Africa 176 feet (54 m). The cathedral is dedicated to St Michael and St George and celebrates its patronal festival on the Sunday closest to Michaelmas (29 September).

== History ==
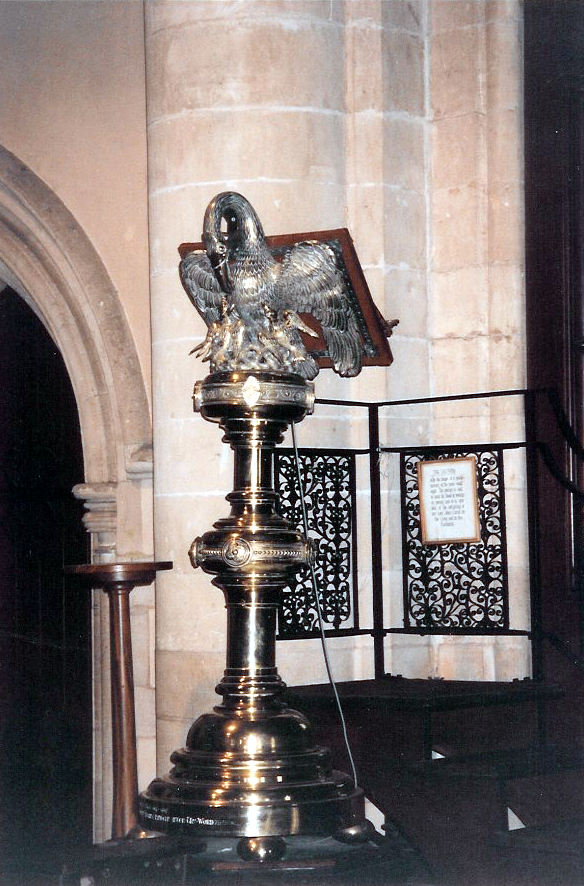
The large ornate lectern still in use in St Michael and St George Cathedral

The Society for the Propagation of the Gospel had voted £500 in 1820 for the erection of a church in Cape Town, this gift was declined by the Governor, Lord Charles Somerset. However, while he was in England next year, he wrote to Lord Bathurst, the Secretary of State for War (who administered the colonies), asking him to obtain the £500 for Grahamstown, where

there is a British Population of upwards of 3000 persons (including the Military) totally destitute of any place of Worship whatever, and under the circumstances that no assistance can be expected to be derived from its Inhabitants in the erection of a Church, they being all Settlers or Soldiers.

The Society very generously agreed, and voted the £500 for Grahamstown, the balance of the money needed was supplied by the colonial treasury. Plans were prepared by W Jones, a land surveyor of Cape Town, and the building erected by George Gilbert also of Cape Town. Sir George Cory thus summarizes the agreement entered into by these persons, and dated 9 September 1824:

The walls from the foundations up to the height of the galleries to be 2ft. 6in. thick and horn there to the roof 2ft. 3in. One side wall was to be supported by two buttresses and the other by three. The roof was to be of thatch. A square tower to be taken up 10 feet higher than the roof and to have a flat top covered with lime and shells. The floors where not occupied by pews to be paved with stone; the "communion" to be raised one foot above the level of the floor and to consist of two equal steps. The columns under the galleries to be of wood, square and framed with panels. Mr Gilbert was allowed to cut down any timber, quarry stone and take clay for bricks from the nearest Government land and to be paid Rds54,000 (£4,050).

It was later decided to use zinc for the roof instead of thatch at an additional cost of Rds 4,730 (£354 15s.). Even so, the roof caused further delays in the completion of the building, which was not opened until 1830. The new church was of course not consecrated, but it bore the name of St George's. The fragment of it that remains, the south wall, is the oldest piece of English Church architecture in the country.

William Geary, the first Colonial Chaplain of Grahamstown (who was appointed and removed by Bathurst), reached the scene of his labours in February 1823. The Colonial Chaplain was frankly a member of the civil service, all collection plate moneys received were paid straight into the public treasury, and when the Chaplain needed anything, he had to apply for it through the same channel as any other civil servant.

The Colonial Secretary is, therefore requested to forward "a tankard, two cups, four plates, a table-cloth, and a surplice". These were received on 8 September following, less the surplice, and Geary then wanted a Bible and a Prayer-Book.

An interesting figure reached Grahamstown in 1833. This was John Heavyside, a missionary of S.P.G. in India. After doing duty at Stellenbosch and elsewhere, he was appointed acting Chaplain at Grahamstown, the appointment being made permanent in 1838. At the time of his arrival, St George's had developed so far as to have a slightly more ecclesiastical form of administration than the landdrost. This was the Church Committee, which probably came into existence at the time the building was opened. Members were appointed by the Government, on the recommendation of the committee. This method of administration was changed by the Church Ordinance of 1839 (during the governorship of Sir George Napier), which remained in force until 1891. The ordinance is an imposing document,

" enacted by the Governor of the Cape of Good Hope, with the advice and consent of the Legislative Council thereof," and to "be judicially taken notice of by all Judges, Magistrates, and others without being specially pleaded." It handed over the "administration and management of all matters connected with the church of Graham's Town, commonly called St George’s Church" to a vestry of not more than eight persons. This vestry was to be elected annually on the second Tuesday in March by "a general meeting of the male inhabitants of Graham's Town aforesaid, and of the parochial limits thereof, being members of, and holding communion with, the united Church of England and Ireland as by law established."

They were to elect churchwardens out of their own number. The "officiating minister for the time being" (there is no word as to his appointment, which was still in the hands of Government) was to preside at all meetings of the vestry. The vestry took over all powers and possessions of the church committee, and was made a corporation capable of suing and being sued. In 1841 the meaning of the words "holding, communion" was queried, and the Attorney-General decided that they did not mean what they said, but that any one professing to be a churchman was a full member of the Church. Governors and colonial chaplains and landdrosts obtaining communion vessels and Royal Engineers (they inspected the building of the church) and pew-rents and church ordinances and secretaries of state for war-it is a queer, mad sort of story

Robert Gray was consecrated as Bishop of Cape Town on St Peter's Day in 1847. He arrived in South Africa on 20 February 1848 and visited Grahamstown on 5 October 1848. At a meeting with the vestry of St George's the bishop explained that he could not consecrate the church as it was not yet conveyed to the see. On 7 June 1849

the Governor of the Colony, in the name and on behalf of Her Majesty, granted the site to Dr Gray, the Bishop of Cape Town, and his successors in the See, on condition that the land hereby granted shall for ever hereafter be used for ecclesiastical purposes in connexion with the Church of England, and to and for no other purpose whatsoever.

Another visitation followed and on 21 September 1850 he consecrated the church and churchyard. "The church was full, the parishioners appearing to take a deep interest in the matter."

== Conflict ==
The Diocese of Grahamstown was founded in 1853 with John Armstrong as the first bishop. During the oversight of Bishop Nathaniel Merriman when Frederick Henry Williams was dean, conflict arose between the two regarding the status of the Church of the Province of Southern Africa versus the Church of England and the validity of the appointments of bishops. Dean Williams then excluded Bishop Merriman from his cathedral. This action resulted in many court cases which Williams won.

Various schemes had been discussed from time to time for the building of a more worthy cathedral, but nothing was done until 1874, when it was discovered that the original tower, in which the town clock had been placed, was in danger. Dean Williams set about the work of collecting funds and was loyally supported by the vestry. Plans were prepared for the tower and spire as part of a complete new building by Sir George Gilbert Scott, at that time the most notable leader of the Gothic revival. He made a free gift to Grahamstown of the various plans and working details and the building of the "Public Clock Tower", as it was called, was carried through by the committee without employing a contractor. The tower and spire were finished in 1878.

Merriman died in 1882 and was succeeded by Allan Becher Webb, then Bishop of Bloemfontein. Webb was elected on 7 March 1883. Dean Williams would not recognise Webb as bishop either so, in November 1883, Webb set up his throne in an iron building (formerly a skating rink) on the site of the present post office to which the name of St Michael's Pro-Cathedral was given. But after Williams's death in August 1885, negotiations between the bishop and the select vestry were begun. Webb became "officiating minister" (the term used in the Church Ordinance) of St George's and officiated at the services on Christmas Day in 1885. After the reconciliation, the building was repaired and Webb began to collect funds for carrying the erection of a worthy cathedral one stage further. After attending the Lambeth Conference of 1888, he returned with £3,000 collected in England. The plans for the chancel were prepared by John Oldrid Scott while William White-Cooper acted as superintending architect and designed several of the fittings. The foundation-stone was laid by Henry Loch, the Governor of the Colony, on 29 January 1890. The completed structure was consecrated by the Bishop Webb on All Saints' Day in 1893 in the presence of the Metropolitan, West Jones, and other bishops.

A new nave, designed by John Oldrid Scott, was dedicated in 1912, just eight days short of the centenary of the establishment of Grahamstown. It is Victorian neo-Gothic in style, with a granite and sandstone exterior, plastered interior walls with marble pillars. The building of the cathedral was finally completed in 1952 with the addition of the Lady Chapel. It can accommodate about 500 people.

== Deanery ==
The deanery is a large Victorian house set in its own grounds adjacent to the cathedral hall. It has reception rooms and a study for the dean on the ground floor and completely private quarters above. There is an additional "bed-sit" attached which is suitable for short-term guests of the parish or the dean. The sub-deanery is a modern four-bedroom house with adequate reception rooms, a very small study, a garage and its own entrance, backing on to the deanery.

== Historical controversy ==
The cathedral was the religious center of the community of Grahamstown. Graham's Town was originally a military outpost on the Eastern Frontier of the Cape Colony. It was founded by Colonel John Graham, who led an expeditionary force to drive the Xhosa back beyond the Fish River in an effort that the first Governor of the Cape Colony, Lieutenant-General John Cradock, characterized as involving no more bloodshed "than was necessary to impress on the minds of these savages a proper degree of terror and respect". A number of the battles of the Xhosa Wars were centred around Grahamstown.

The cathedral became the primary location for memorials to those fallen combatants of the conflicts between the original residents of the lands and the European settlers. Many of these memorials refer to the opposition in the battles, using terms which are no longer acceptable in the Rainbow Nation of South Africa. Today, these memorial plaques are covered as an acknowledgement of the diversity in the Anglican Church of Southern Africa. Nevertheless, the early days of the Anglican church in Grahamstown demonstrates the unstable nature of the relationship between the indigenous peoples and the settlers and the ongoing process of reconciliation in South Africa. A quote from John Armstrong, the first bishop of Grahamstown attests to this controversial history:

On the calm, quiet day, as we were travelling along so peacefully, the rumours of war could not but come back to us, as our drivers pointed out the spots where many a bitter struggle for life had taken place, and especially where a body of poor Sappers had been surprised and slaughtered by the Kafirs in the late war.

== Dean of Grahamstown ==
The Dean of Grahamstown is the incumbent of the cathedral. The dean has other duties and roles set out in the "Deed of Constitution and Statutes of the Chapter of the Cathedral of St Michael and St George, Grahamstown" which is an appendix to the acts of the Diocese of Grahamstown. The 21st and current dean is Mzinzisi Dyantyi who was appointed in 2021.

== Bells ==
=== History ===
The first ring of bells to be installed in Africa was hung in the cathedral tower in 1879. The bells, an octave cast by John Warner and Sons in London, were supplied complete with fittings and with a frame of English oak. The chancel was consecrated by Bishop Webb on 1 November 1893 and was dedicated to both St George and St Michael to mark the healing of a historic breach in the diocese. In 1902 remedial work was undertaken on the bell frame and fittings in the tower.

The frame was assembled in the tower by local labour but not, apparently, in the way in which Warners had intended. Henry Carter Galpin, (Note: H.C. Galpin was the father of Ernest Edward Galpin, botanist and banker) a local clockmaker, had been employed by the town council to install the town clock in the cathedral tower. He wished it to strike on bells other than those intended by Warners and modified the frame accordingly, placing one bell in a subsidiary frame raised above the other bells. As a result, seven of the eight bells swung in the same direction. This made the bells extremely difficult to ring and it is probable that they were only, initially, swung chimed. In 1887 it was reported that the joint of the bell frame "require tightening up throughout".

In 1902 remedial work was undertaken on the bell frame and fittings and a band was in training under the tuition of a "Cape Town expert", a Mr Stephens. In 1903 the ringers were "Mr Lancaster (Captain), Dr Drury, Messrs G. Barnes, Charles Cory, Huntly and Walker". The bell frame, however, still gave trouble and ringing ceased in 1913.

In 1959 "Mr Eardley from Stoke-on-Trent ... fitted new ropes" and undertook sufficient maintenance to enable four bells to be rung. In 1968 a change ringing band was formed under the tuition of Paul Spencer, who had learned to ring at Armitage Bridge in Yorkshire, and Bill Jackson, who had learned at Dalton-in-Furness in Lancashire.

In 1993, supported by Rhodes University, the bells were rehung in a new steel frame donated by Koch's Cut and Supply Steel Centre of Pinetown, Durban, with new headstocks provided by Eayre and Smith (Overseas) Ltd, now part of John Taylor & Co. The frame was designed by Dr Ray Ayres with pits for ten bells and was assembled in the tower by local labour guided by Dave Webster of Eayre and Smith and by Colin Lewis. The first peal on the bells was rung on 17 December 1995, conducted by Alan Regin in 3 hours and 12 minutes: Cambridge Surprise Major.

In 1997 two trebles, cast the previous year in London at the Whitechapel Bell Foundry, were added to the ring. The first peal on the ten was rung on 4 April 1998, conducted by Timothy G. Pett in 3 hours 19 minutes: Cambridge Surprise Royal.

By the end of 2000, five peals and 27 quarter-peals had been rung on the bells.

=== Bell details ===
Details of the bells are:

Bell no	1	2	3	4	5	6	7	8	9	10
Weight (kg)	288	319	362	376	392	500	698	781	961	1302
Note	G	F	E♭	D	C	B♭	A♭	G	F	E♭

=== Bell ringing in Grahamstown today ===
The band presently ring call-changes and Plain Hunts on Sundays from 18:00–18:55. Rhodes University used to offer a course leading to the Certificate in Change Ringing.

=== Bell ringing at Hillandale ===
The Cathedral band also ring at Hillandale, some 10 kilometres (6.2 mi) from Grahamstown, where there is a light-weight ring of four bells at the Monastery of the Order of the Holy Cross that was installed in 1999. Ringing there is under the direction of the Cathedral Ringing Master. By the end of July 2001, four quarter-peals had been rung at Hillandale, all by the Cathedral band.

== Gallery ==
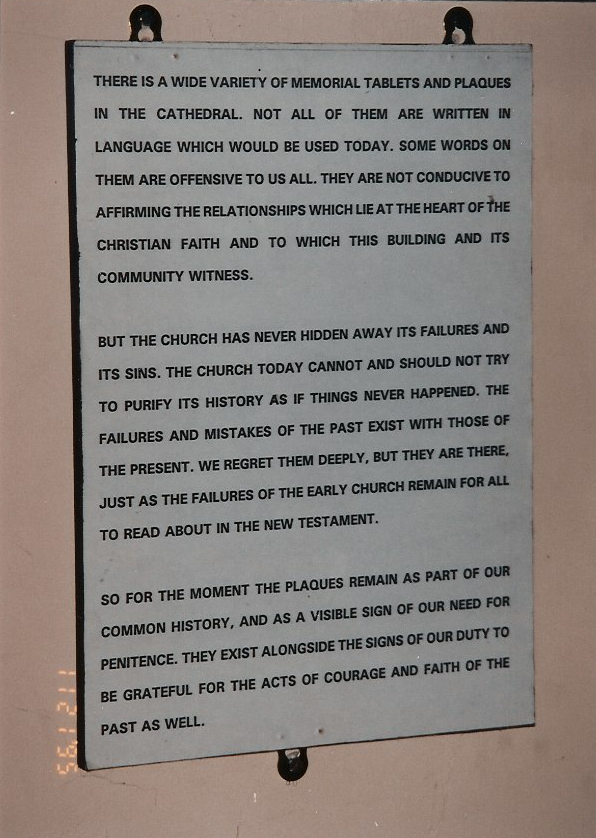
Explanatory statement regarding plaques in 1995

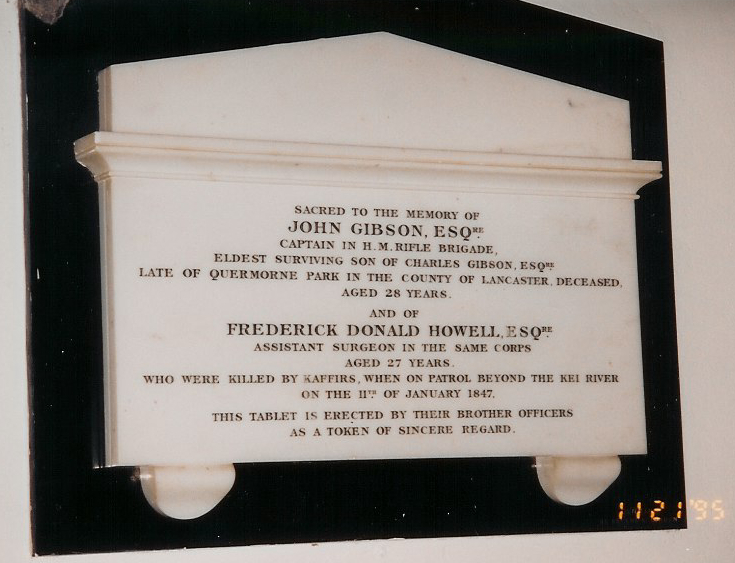
John Gibson and Frederick Donald Howell memorial

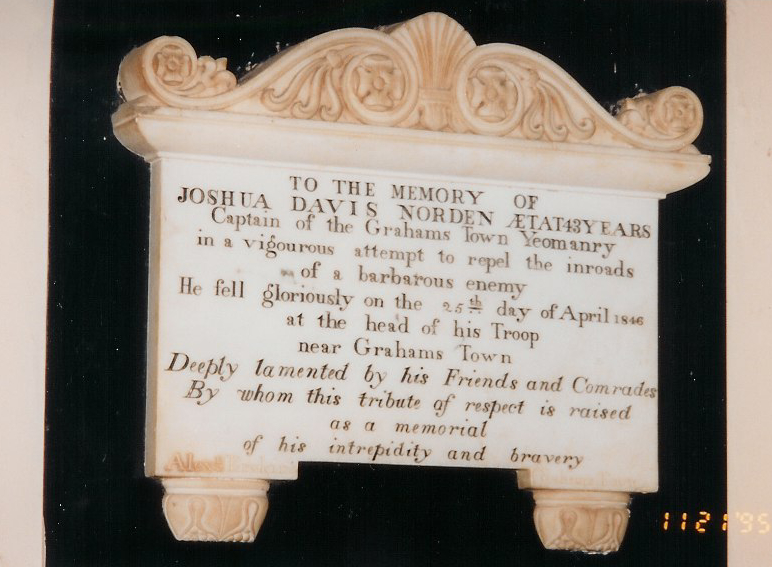
Joshua Davis Norden memorial (Note: This tablet is on the west wall of the cathedral and commemorates Joshua Davis Norden (1803–46), who arrived at Algoa Bay with Wilson's party in the Belle Alliance in May 1820. After various farming disasters, Norden opened an auctioneer's business in Grahamstown in 1835, became a commissioner of the municipality and established a burgher force for the defence of the town ("Norden's Yeomanry"). He was killed in action during the War of the Axe; his body was recovered and buried with full military honours in the Jewish cemetery. His fellow soldiers erected the plaque in the cathedral.)

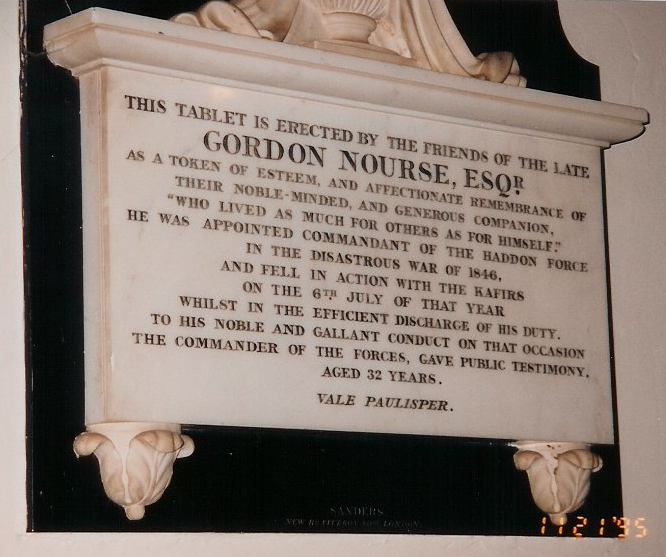
Gordon Nourse memorial

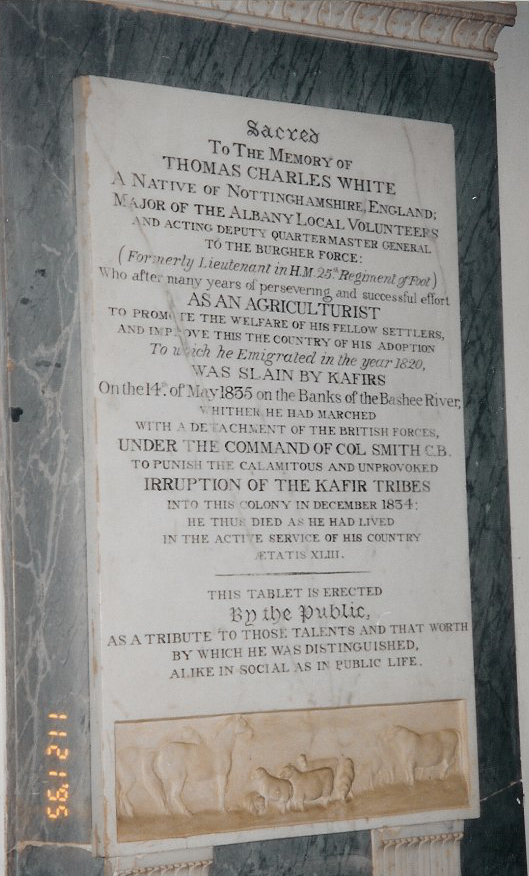
Thomas Charles White memorial

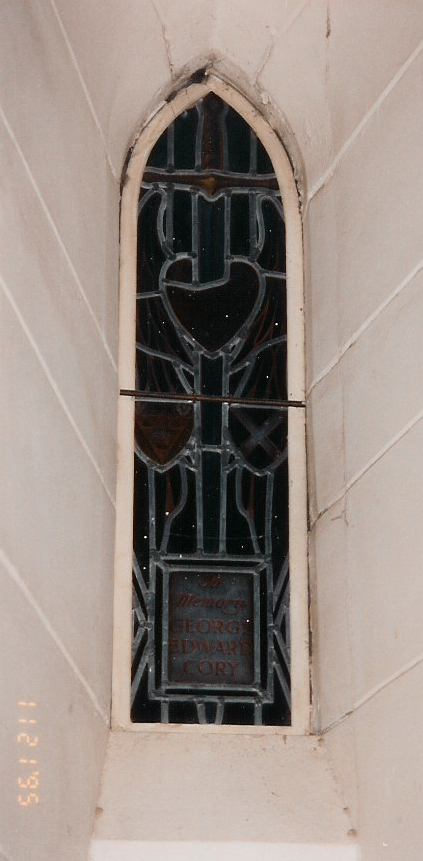
Edward Cory memorial window

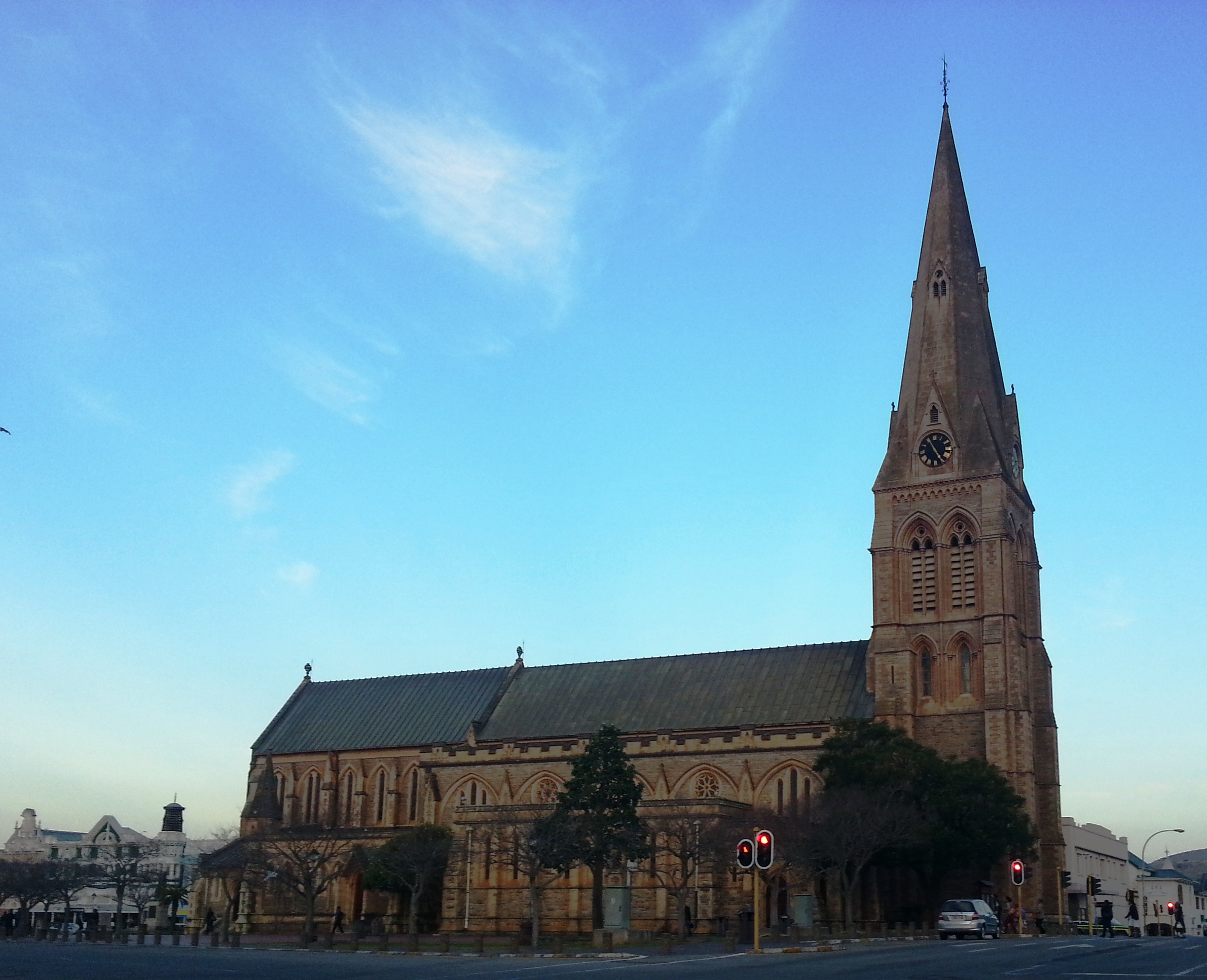
Cathedral

== Notes and references ==
Citations

Bibliography

- Berning, J. M. (1987). The tower, clock and bells of Grahamstown Cathedral: an outline history. Cory Library for Historical Research. ISBN 9780868101538.
- Theal, George McCall (2010). Records of the Cape Colony 1793-1831 Copied for the Cape Government, from the Manuscript Documents in the Public Record Office (Volume 8), London. p. 403. ISBN 978-1-152-79488-7.
- Cory, Sir George (1926). The Rise of South Africa: Volume 2, 1820-1834. Longmans.
- Gould, Charles; Eve, Jeanette (2011). Grahamstown Cathedral: A Guide and Short History. Eastern Cape Reprints. Grahamstown Diocesan Registry. ISBN 9780868104737.
- Gray, Robert (1849). A Journal of the Bishop's Visitation Tour Through the Cape Colony in 1848: With an Account of His Visit to the Island of St. Helena in 1849 and a Map. Society for the Propagation of the Gospel.
- Maclennan, Ben (1986). A proper degree of terror: John Graham and the Cape's eastern frontier. Ravan Press. ISBN 978-0-86975-235-7.
- Carter, Thomas Thellusson (1857). A Memoir of John Armstrong, D.D.: Late Lord Bishop of Grahamstown. John Henry and James Parker.
- Merriman, Nathaniel James (1957). The Cape Journals of Archdeacon N. J. Merriman, 1848-1855. The Van Riebeeck Society.
- Saron, Gustav; Hotz, Louis (1955). The Jews in South Africa. A History. Edited by G. Saron and L. Hotz. [With Plates and a Map]. Cape Town.
