= John Armstrong (bishop of Grahamstown) =

- Bishop of Grahamstown
- Church: Anglican
- Diocese: Grahamstown
- In office: 1853 – 1856
- Predecessor: First incumbent
- Successor: Henry Cotterill
- Previous post(s): Vicar of Tidenham

Orders
- Ordination: 1837
- Consecration: 1853

Personal details
- Born: 22 August 1813; Bishop-Wearmouth
- Died: 16 May 1856 (aged 42); Grahamstown

John Armstrong (22 August 1813 – 16 May 1856) was a Church of England cleric who became the Bishop of Grahamstown in South Africa.

Armstrong was born in Bishop-Wearmouth on 22 August 1813, the second child and eldest son of a physician who had settled in London around 1818. When he was eight years old, Armstrong was sent to a preparatory school in Hanwell under the care of a Dr Bond. He suffered much during this time from rheumatism and delicacy of health and his studies were often interrupted. In 1827, aged 14, he was sent to Charterhouse School. He went in 1832, when nearly 19 years of age, to a private tutor, the Revd James Tweed, of Harlow, Essex, with the view of fitting himself to become a candidate for Lord Crowe's Exhibition at Lincoln College, Oxford. About this time the resolution was formed to devote himself to the ministry. He took a third-class degree in classics in Michaelmas term, 1836. In 1837 he was ordained deacon and commenced his ministry as curate of Alford in Somersetshire.

Armstrong was consecrated as Bishop of Grahamstown at Lambeth Parish Church on 30 November 1853 (St. Andrew's Day), but he did not reach the Diocese of Grahamstown until the following October.

Armstrong, who was a man of delicate health, devoted himself to two prime objects. The first was missions to the heathen, which had been completely neglected by the Church. The bishop laid the foundations upon which the missionary work of the diocese and St John's was built. His further object was the successful founding of St. Andrew's College, Grahamstown, in 1855, whose dedication commemorates the date of his consecration. But the rough travelling and many anxieties of his diocese were too severe for the bishop's delicate frame and he died on 16 May 1856 after less than two years in the country.

He is the author of the hymn text O Thou who makest souls to shine which appears in some of the editions of Hymns Ancient and Modern.

His son, Edward, became a noted historian.

== Notes and references ==
- Gould, Charles (1924). Grahamstown Cathedral: A Guide and Short History. Grahamstown Diocesan Registry.
- Currie, R.F. (1955). St. Andrew's College Grahamstown 1855-1955. Oxford: Basil Blackwell.
- Carter, Thomas Thellusson (1857). A Memoir of John Armstrong, D.D.: Late Lord Bishop of Grahamstown. John Henry and James Parker – via Project Canterbury.
- Nicholson, Sir Sydney Hugo; Knight, Gerald Hocken; Dykes Bower, J. (1972). Hymns Ancient and Modern: Revised. William Clowes and Sons.
- Overton, John Henry (1885–1900). "Armstrong, John (1813-1856)" . Dictionary of National Biography. London: Smith, Elder & Co.

Anglican Church of Southern Africa titles
New diocese	Bishop of Grahamstown; 1853 – 1856	Succeeded by Henry Cotterill
