= Diocese of Central Zambia =

The Diocese of Central Zambia is one of 15 dioceses within the Anglican Church of the Province of Central Africa. It was inaugurated in 1971: the first bishop was Jack Cunningham and the current bishop is Derek Kamukwamba.
