= Diocese of Grahamstown =

Anglican Church of Southern Africa diocese

Diocese of Grahamstown Bisdom van Grahamstad IDayosisi yaseRhini

Location
- Country: South Africa
- Ecclesiastical province: Southern Africa
- Archdeaconries: 11

Statistics
- Parishes: 56

Information
- Rite: Anglican
- Established: 1853; 173 years ago
- Cathedral: Cathedral of St Michael and St George

Current leadership
- Bishop of Grahamstown: Mcebisi Pinyana
- Metropolitan Archbishop: Thabo Makgoba, Archbishop of Cape Town

Website
- www.grahamstowndiocese.org.za

The Diocese of Grahamstown is a diocese of the Anglican Church of Southern Africa. It is centred on the historic city of Makhanda in the Eastern Cape Province of South Africa. The diocese extends to East London, in the east and Port Alfred to the south.

== History ==
=== Founding ===
Very early in his episcopate the first bishop of Cape Town, Robert Gray saw the necessity for a division of his diocese. The wars in the Eastern Province stressed the need for a missionary bishop to the natives harrying the borders, and in 1851 Gray brought the question before a synod of clergy. He realised in his canonical visitation of 1850 that Natal and Kaffraria must be separate sees, for precipitous mountains made communication in those days almost impossible. Saint Helena, too, with the islands of Ascension and Tristan da Cunha, needed more regular spiritual help and supervision than a bishop at Cape Town could give. Therefore, in 1852 Bishop Gray went to England to ask advice about such a division, and to beg for men and money for new sees. In spite of painful illness he spoke all over England, 300 times on that visit, to let churchmen know the need of reduction in the size of his diocese which stretched north to the Orange River and eastward to the Great Kei River. With the help of the Society for the Propagation of the Gospel the new sees of Grahamstown and Natal were created with the money the bishop had begged.

John Armstrong became the first bishop of Grahamstown and John William Colenso went to Natal. The two sees were constituted under Letters patent in 1853 and, a fortnight later, Gray received his new Letters patent for his diminished See of Cape Town and as Metropolitan of South Africa.

In 1866, N. J. Merriman was Archdeacon of Grahamstown and Henry Kitton Archdeacon of British Kaffraria.

=== Early development ===
The story of the foundation of the Grahamstown diocese under its first bishop, John Armstrong, is very different from that of Natal. Archdeacon Merriman had already set the key of missionary enthusiasm, courage, and self-devotion to which the new diocese was tuned. He arrived in Grahamstown in 1848 and his journeys on foot through his huge archdeaconry are famous. He offered to be the first missionary to the Xhosas, but Bishop Gray could not spare him as archdeacon, and wished him to be the first bishop; this his humility refused.

The Grahamstown diocese bordered on the often-debated and altered boundary between the Colony and Kaffraria. From the time of the first Kafir War of 1779, skirmishes, massacres, raids, and counter-attacks had taken place on both sides of the River Fish or Keiskama or whatever the authorities had decided the Kafirs must not cross. Different governors had tried to subdue the invading Xhosas by force of arms, but they had returned, and the problem seemed to be insoluble when either the astuteness of Moshesh, or merely the credulity of the natives when their witch-doctors speak, brought about their own undoing by the tragic cattle-killing of 1857. Then Galekas, Gaikas, Tembus, at the bidding of a witch-doctor and his niece, slew their cattle, believing that, when that was done, their chieftain ancestors would appear and lead them to victory against the hated white men. Instead, famine came and death from starvation, and though Sir George Grey, Governor and High Commissioner, 1854-1861, sent food, and missioners housed all they could, the numbers in British Kaffraria alone fell from 184,000 to 37,000, and the Kafir power disappeared as it seemed for ever.

This wise Governor had realised before this catastrophe that, owing to the Crimean War (1854), it was impossible for Britain to spare troops to keep the natives behind the boundary lines of their territories, and he had settled German legionaries and others in the confiscated native reserves on military tenure, and had also offered large Government grants to the various missions to build churches, industrial schools, hospitals, believing that educating the natives was cheaper than sending troops to shoot them. Many new mission schools were being built by Methodists with these grants, and both Bishop Gray and the new Bishop of Grahamstown realised the enormous opportunity given to the Church to found missions to the ama-Xhosa. Both bishops wrote imploring S.P.G. to send men. As soon as possible after his arrival Bishop Armstrong visited Umhalla, of whom Bishop Gray had written on his visitation in 1850:

"I have undertaken to found a mission in Umhalla's country midway between King William's Town and the Kei river. The chief has about 10,000 people under him, and here we hope to begin work."

The chief had granted to the Church a site for a mission near the deserted Fort Waterloo. Mr. Clayton was the first missionary there, and the stone of the first church for the Xhosas was laid on St. Luke's Day, 1854, and the mission took that evangelist saint as its patron. From there the bishop travelled up the Booma Pass, where many British troops had been ambushed and massacred, to Keiskama Hoek, a military station, with Mr. Dacre as its chaplain. Here in the fastnesses of the Amatolas lived the Gaikas, under their lame chief Sandile, but when they were expelled their land was given to the Fingoes, who had helped the British in the Xhosa wars. The Fingo chief gladly heard the bishop's proposal for a mission among his people, where they would learn about Christianity, and also about better ways of agriculture. The chief offered land not far from the Hoek, and Mr. Dacre nobly began work in the time he could spare from his military duties. He made the invaluable water-furrow for the mission lands, still in use, and by his influence paved the way for the first resident missionary there, H. B. Smith, who arrived in September, 1855. Sir George Grey granted 693 acres of land to this mission, which was called St. Matthew's.

During Bishop Armstrong's second journey in 1855, he visited Sandile, who at once consented to have Church missions in his land, and offered a site near his kraal on the Kabusie river. This was eventually called St. John's. There still remained the great Kreli, who lived further east across the Kei, and to see him the bishop travelled through bare country, with scarcely a human being, or an animal, or even a green bush, to be seen for miles, and the hot sun beating down was paralysing. A police horse was lent to him, which saved him from the almost intolerable jolting of the waggon over the rough veld, and after nearly a week's journey he reached the banks of the White Kei, across which, nearly seven miles away, was the king's kraal. Here, with fifty men, Kreli came to visit the bishop. He very readily agreed to have missionaries in his country, though his 600,000 people were not in any way under British rule. A little later the great mission station of St. Mark's was founded by Henry Waters.

=== Later developments ===
The Diocese of Grahamstown has been divided three times in its history; three independent daughter diocese have been formed:

- Diocese of Mthatha (formerly Diocese of St John's) in 1872
- Diocese of Port Elizabeth in 1970
- Diocese of Ukhahlamba in 2009

== Diocesan structure ==
The diocese is split into 11 archdeaconries; each of which comprises a number of parishes:

=== Archdeaconry of Albany ===
Archdeacon: the Reverend Canon Cynthia Webstock

- St Barnabas, Alicedale33°18′55″S 26°05′07″E
- St Barnabas, Namato, Port Alfred 33°34′39″S 26°53′30″E
- St Cyprian, Highlands 33.33537°S 26.31193°E
- St James, Southwell 33.536503°S 26.689031°E
- St John the Evangelist, Bathurst 33°30′07″S 26°49′12″E
- St Mary, Cuylerville33.49330°S 27.01366°E
- St Paul, Port Alfred 33.590074°S 26.894439°E
- St Peter, Sidbury 33°25′18″S 26°10′22″E

=== Archdeaconry of Alice ===
- Church of the Resurrection
- Holy Trinity Fort Beaufort
- St Andrew Bedford
- St Bartholomew Alice 32°47′09″S 26°49′49″E
- St John Fort Beaufort
- St Matthew Keiskammahoek
- St Michael Adelaide
- St Patrick Hogsback 32.577467°S 26.92155°E

=== Archdeaconry of East London Central ===
Arhdeacon: Ven. Nkosiphendule Matshaya

- Good Shepherd
- St Francis, Mdantsane
- St John's, East London
- St Saviour's, East London 33.00594°S 27.8997°E

=== Archdeaconry of East London Scenery Park ===
- St Bernard Mizeki
- St James Mooiplaas
- St John Gwaba
- St Peter Zozo
- St Paul Komga
- St Cyprian's

=== Archdeaconry of East London East ===
- St Martin Gonubie 32.94162°S 28.02265°E
- St Michael Nahoon
- St Nicholas Beacon Bay
- St Luke Newlands
- St Phillip Gompo

=== Archdeaconry of Kidd's Beach ===
- St Mary and St Andrew
- St David Ncerha
- St Mary Pumlani
- St Barnabas Tsholomnqa

=== Archdeaconry of East London South ===
- St Alban's, Vincent
- St Andrew's, Mdantsane
- St Peter's, West Bank
- All Saints', East London

=== Archdeaconry of East London West ===
- St Gregory's, Mdantsane
- Holy Cross Mdantsane
- St Mark's, Cambridge 32.97272°S 27.88239°E
- Christ Church Amalinda

=== Archdeaconry of Grahamstown ===
Archdeacon: the Venerable Mzinzisi Dyantyi

- St. Michael and St. George Cathedral 33.3101°S 26.5267°E
- Christ Church 33.30586°S 26.523800°E
- St Bartholomew 33.314549°S 26.531186°E
- St Philip 33.308739°S 26.543286°E
- St Clement 33.307216°S 26.532038°E
- St Augustine 33.28920°S 26.55877°E
- Chapelry of St Peter's Hilton 33.248199°S 26.355269°E

=== Archdeaconry of King William's Town East ===
Archdeacon : The Venerable Gareth Jones

- St Katharine, Berlin
- Holy Trinity, King William's Town 32.87348°S 27.38869°E
- St Luke Mdolomba
- St Paul Zeleni
- St John and St Chad
- Holy Name, Stutterheim
- St Barnabas, Stutterheim 32.570342°S 27.427905°E

=== Archdeaconry of King William's Town West ===
Archdeacon: The Venerable Peter Mtuze

- All Saints Breidbach
- Holy Trinity Dimbaza
- St Andrew Ginsberg
- St James Peddie
- St Peter Peddie

== Coat of arms ==
Diocesan arms (1886)

The diocese has borne two coats of arms over the years.

The original arms, assumed around 1853, were : Argent, a saltire Gules surmounted by an anchor Sable.

They were replaced with the present arms in 1886 : Argent, on a cross Gules a sword wavy proper, in the first quarter an anchor Sable. These were formally granted by the College of Arms in 1949.

== Notes and references ==
- Anon (1866). The Clergy List for 1866. London: George Cox.
- Lewis, Cecil; Edwards, G. E. (1935). South Africa: The Growth of the Church of the Province. London: Society for Promoting Christian Knowledge. Archived from the original on 2014-02-24.
- Brownell, F. G. (2002). Heraldry in the Church of the Province of Southern Africa, 1847-2000: Coats of Arms of the Dioceses, Collegiate and Parish Churches, and the Order of Ethiopia. Heraldsholme CC. ISBN 978-0-620-28606-0.
