= List of deans of Grahamstown =

This is a list of deans of Grahamstown. The dean is the incumbent of Grahamstown Cathedral, Eastern Cape Province, South Africa. In addition, the dean has other duties and roles set out in the "Deed of Constitution and Statutes of the Chapter of the Cathedral of St Michael and St George, Grahamstown" which is an appendix to the acts of the Diocese of Grahamstown. The 21st and current dean is Mzinzisi Dyantyi, who was appointed in 2021.

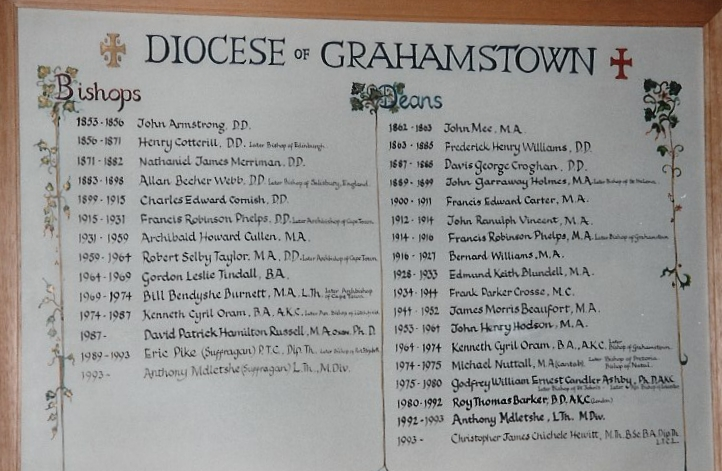
Diocesan chart showing bishops and deans of St Michael and St George Cathedral

== List of deans ==
- 1862 - John Mee
- 1863 - Frederick Henry Williams
- 1885 - Interregnum
- 1887 - Davis George Croghan
- 1889 - John Garraway Holmes (later Bishop of St Helena)
- 1900 - Francis Edward Carter
- 1912 - John Ranulph Vincent
- 1914 - Francis Robinson Phelps (later Bishop of Grahamstown, then Archbishop of Cape Town)
- 1916 - Bernard Williams
- 1928 - Edmund Keith Blundell
- 1934 - Frank Parker Crosse
- 1944 - James Morris Beaufort
- 1953 - John Henry Hodson
- 1964 - Kenneth Cyril Oram (later Bishop of Grahamstown)
- 1974 - Michael Nuttall (later Bishop of Pretoria, then Bishop of Natal)
- 1975 - Godfrey William Ernest Candler Ashby (later Bishop of St John's)
- 1980 - Roy Thomas Barker
- 1992 - Anthony Mdletshe (later Suffragan Bishop of Grahamstown, then Bishop of Zululand)
- 1993 - Chich Hewitt
- 2000 - John Stubbs
- 2007 - Interregnum
- 2008 - Andrew Hunter
- 2021 Mzinzisi Dyantyi

== Notes and references ==
- "Umbuliso". Newsletter of the Diocese of Grahamstown. 31 (2). 2008.
- Gould, Charles (1924). Grahamstown Cathedral: A Guide and Short History. Grahamstown Diocesan Registry.
- Gould, Charles; Eve, Jeanette (2011). Grahamstown Cathedral: A Guide and Short History. Eastern Cape Reprints.
- Venn, John (1897). Biolgraphical History of Gonville and Caius College 1349-1897. Cambridge: University Press.
- Merriman, Nathaniel James; Cooper, Charles James; Williams, Frederick Henry (1885). The South African Church Question. The Grahamstown Judgment. Decision ... in the Appeal of "Merriman V. Williams". Edited, with an Introduction, by Charles James Cooper ... New Edition. The Introduction in Great Part Re-written. Geo. Barber.
- Mumm, Susan (2001). All Saints Sisters of the Poor: An Anglican Sisterhood in the Nineteenth Century. Boydell & Brewer. p. 63. ISBN 978-0-85115-728-3.
- Thomson, Theodore Radford (1955). Epsom College Register, 1855-1954. Edited by T.R. Thomson. [With Plates and a Plan.]. Oxford.
- Lewis, C.A. (2008). "Oxbridge clerics and early ringing in South Africa". The Ringing World (5087): 1101–1105.
- Meer, Shamim (1998). Women Speak: Reflections on Our Struggles, 1982-1997. Oxfam. p. 107. ISBN 978-0-85598-416-8.
