= Kate Clark (writer) =

New Zealand children's writer, poet and artist (1847–1926)

- Born: Kate Emma Woolnough; 15 May 1847 Ipswich, Suffolk, England
- Died: 30 November 1926 (aged 79) Auckland, New Zealand
- Occupation: Children's writer; poet; artist; community worker
- Notable works: A Southern Cross Fairy Tale (1891)
- Spouse: James Clark (m. 1875; died 1898)
- Children: 5

Kate Emma McCosh Clark (née Woolnough; 15 May 1847 – 30 November 1926) was a New Zealand children's writer, poet, artist and community worker. She wrote and illustrated an early New Zealand children's book, A Southern Cross Fairy Tale, which was published in London in 1891. Her other works included Persephone and other Poems (1894) and Maori Tales and Legends (1896).

== Early life and marriage ==
Clark was born at Ipswich, Suffolk, England, in 1847, to Susan Bonner and her husband, Henry Woolnough, an architect. She studied art and lived in London, earning a living by undertaking research for writers, often at the British Museum.

On 8 April 1875 she married James Clark, an Auckland businessman, in Melbourne. Two days later, on a Saturday, the Auckland premises of Archibald Clark and Sons were closed to give employees the opportunity to celebrate the wedding. She had five children while they lived in Auckland, and their first son was born on 28 December 1875. From 1880 to 1883 her husband was the Mayor of Auckland.

== Career ==
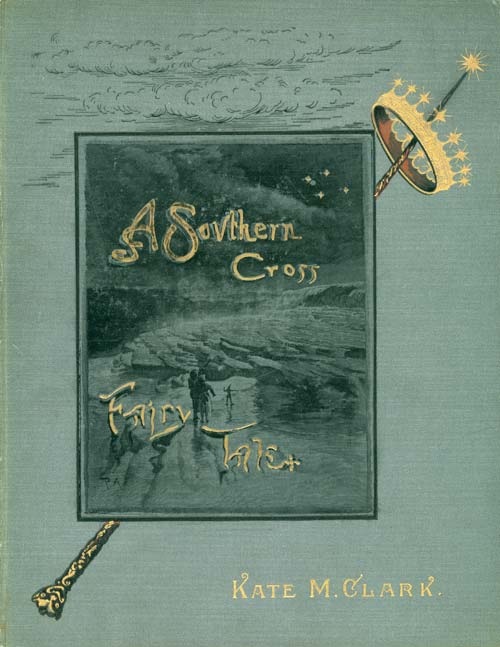
Cover of A Southern Cross Fairy Tale by Clark, 1891

Clark became an important organiser and contributor to charitable organisations in Auckland. The family had a large home in Remuera on 12 acres of land. The Anglican bishop of Auckland, William Cowie, described her as being "specially gifted as a hostess, being gracious to everybody, desirous of helping all who need her aid, and most interesting as an accomplished painter and a woman of rare good sense". Together with her husband, she helped reform the Auckland Society of Arts in 1880, and sat on the committee for ten years. In 1882 she worked closely with Eliza Cowie to establish a charitable organisation called the Girls' Friendly Society, of which she became vice president. She also sat on the management committee of the Women's Home in Parnell and was involved in the Jubilee Institute for the Blind.

Clark was an artist drawing in pen and ink and also painting watercolours and in oils. She regularly exhibited including in the Auckland Society of Arts, The New Zealand Industrial Exhibition, Wellington in 1885 and the Centennial Exhibition, Melbourne 1888–89.

After a number of her husband's businesses failed, the family moved to London in 1889, where Clark pursued a career as a writer. She wrote a New Zealand children's book, A Southern Cross Fairy Tale, which was illustrated by herself and Robert Atkinson. It was published in London in 1891. The book featured Santa Claus, goblins and fairy characters, but was set in the natural features and world of New Zealand, and was enhanced by notes on geological features such as the Pink and White Terraces by A.P.W. Thomas and on birds by Andreas Reischek. It attempted to translate Northern Hemisphere Christmas imagery into a New Zealand setting; Clark said it was written for the children "growing up under the Southern Cross ... with English speech and English hearts, to whom the Yule log at Christmas is unmeaning and the snows unknown".

She published a collection of verse in 1894 titled Persephone and other Poems. The poetry involved classical themes and a strong sense of nostalgia for natural beauty and childhood innocence. Her last work Maori Tales and Legends (1896), was intended to interest and instruct young people about New Zealand and the Māori people, and was also illustrated by Atkinson. She noted in the introduction that she had "endeavoured to adhere to the true spirit of the tales themselves, and to give them the form, expression and speech characteristic of the country and clever native race". Her sources included George Grey and Tāwhiao, the Māori king. Of the latter, she said she met him on several occasions and "heard much that was valuable regarding the Maoris". She also wrote newspaper articles and short stories which were published in magazines. In 1895 the family home in Remuera was sold to King's College; the land was subsequently taken over by King's School.

In 1899, along with Beatrice Webb, she represented the National Council of Women of New Zealand at the London meeting of the International Council of Women. She returned to New Zealand in 1900 and died in Auckland on 30 November 1926. In her obituary she was described by the New Zealand Herald as being "a woman of many accomplishments in literature, music and art".
