= Edmund Blundell =

Edmund Blundell may refer to:

- Edmund Augustus Blundell (1804–1868), British diplomat
- Edmund Blundell (priest) (1896–1961), Anglican clergyman in South Africa
