= Petrus van der Velden =

Dutch painter

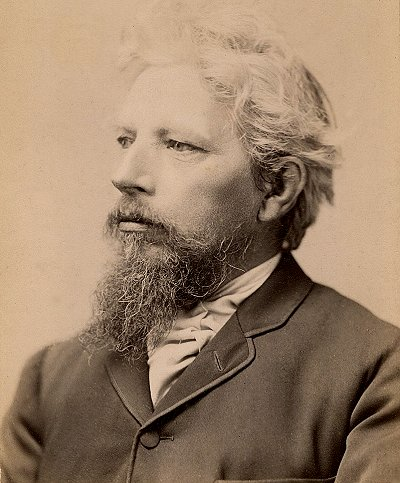
- Petrus van der Velden in 1896
- Born: 5 May 1837; Rotterdam, Netherlands
- Died: 11 November 1913 (aged 76); Auckland, New Zealand
- Known for: Painter

Petrus van der Velden (5 May 1837 – 11 November 1913), who is also known as Paulus van der Velden, was a Dutch artist who spent much of his later career in New Zealand.

== Early life and career in the Netherlands ==
Petrus van der Velden was born in Rotterdam; his parents were Jacoba van Essel and Joannes van der Velden, a warehouse manager. Petrus began drawing lessons at around the age of 13 and subsequently apprenticed as a lithographer. In 1858 he founded a lithographic printing company in Rotterdam with business partner J. G. Zijderman.

The earliest known paintings by van der Velden date to around 1864; in 1867 he wound up the printing business and began painting and exhibiting full-time. He studied at the academies in Rotterdam and Berlin. He registered at the Academy of Art, Rotterdam in 1868. After a stay on the island of Marken (1871–73) he lived in or near The Hague until 1888 and was part of the Hague School in artistic and stylistic origins. During this period he painted mainly genre scenes such as The Dutch Funeral (1872, collection of the Christchurch Art Gallery) and the Old Cellist (1887, The Hague, Gemeentemus.); he also produced some landscapes, for example Snow on the Sand Dunes (1889–90, collection of the Museum of New Zealand Te Papa Tongarewa). His work of this period displays a tension between Naturalism and Romantic Realism in the style of Jozef Israëls.

On 3 August 1876, at Rotterdam, he married Sophia Wilhelmina Eckhart, also of Rotterdam and sister of the sculptor David Eckhart. After their marriage they moved to Wassenaar, near The Hague. They were to have three children: Wilhelm, Gerard and Hendrika Alice.

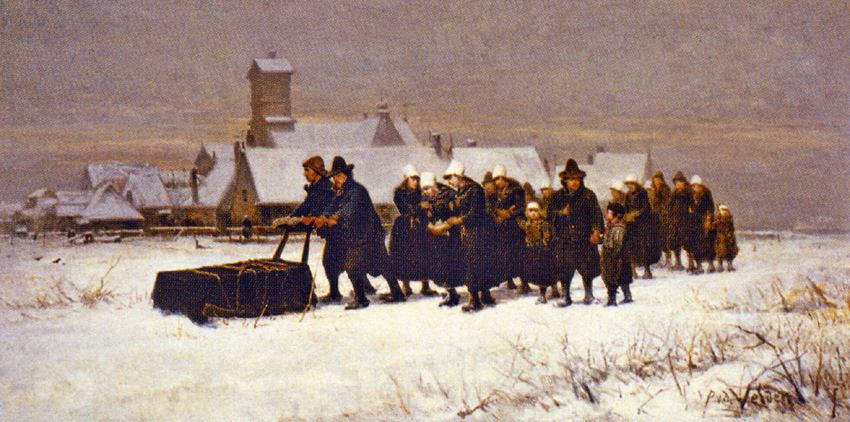
The Dutch Funeral, 1872

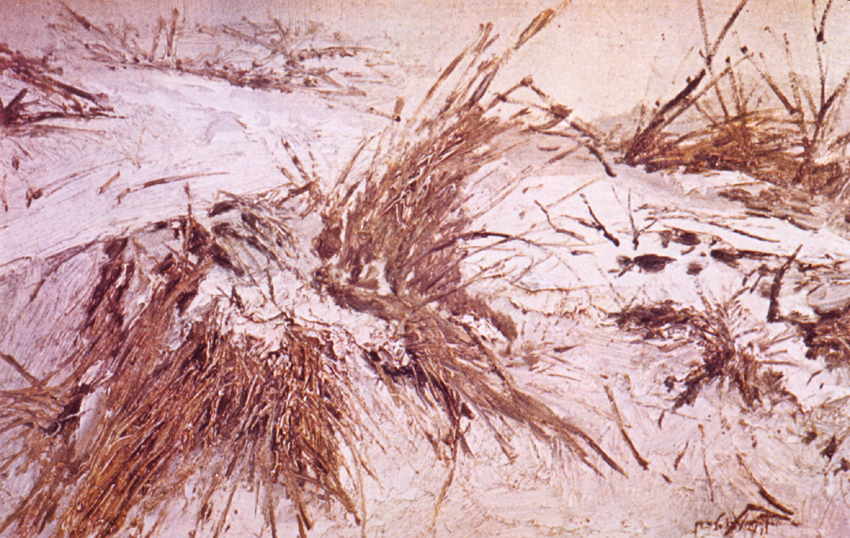
Snow on the Sand Dunes, 1880

== Life and career in New Zealand ==
It is not known exactly why van der Velden emigrated to New Zealand in 1890 with his wife and children (one daughter and two sons), aged 53, but he was supported by Gerrit van Asch, the founder of the Sumner School for the Deaf. Van der Velden arrived in Christchurch, where he stayed until 1898.

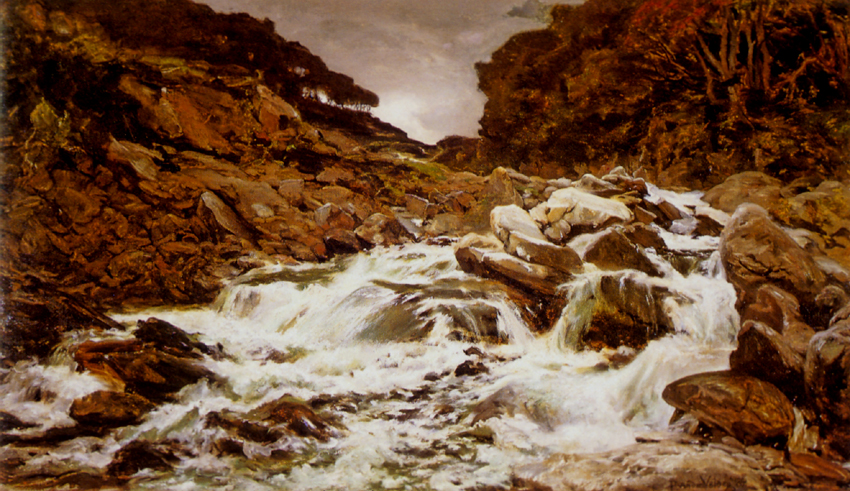
Waterfall in the Otira (aka Mountain Stream), 1891

It was during the 1890s that van der Velden discovered Otira Gorge on the West Coast, which provided him with his most successful and enduring subject. The first trip took place in January–February 1891 and the primary work produced was Waterfall in the Otira (aka Mountain Stream) (1891). Van der Velden treated the Otira landscape as an opportunity to evoke the sublime, and sought out appropriate opportunities to depict it; as a student of his later recalled:

When I was last at Otira, a resident of the place who remembered van der Velden told me that the Dutchman was evidently quite mad. Evidently? Yes; because at all those times when the thunder rolled, and wind howled, and rain poured, van der Velden would go into the Gorge, whereas all those times when the sun shone from a cloudless sky, he would lie with his back to the grass near the hotel and sleep.

Waterfall in the Otira was shown in art society exhibitions in Auckland, Christchurch and Dunedin, and met with considerable critical acclaim. The painting was acquired by the Otago Art Society for the Dunedin Public Art Gallery collection in 1893 for the significant sum of £300. Van der Velden returned to the Otira Gorge and Arthurs Pass areas in the winter of 1893, when he added Mount Rolleston to his Otira motifs. Although van der Velden only made two sketching trips to Otira, he returned to the subjects many times, including when living in Wellington in the 1910s. Examples of these later works include Mount Rolleston, Otira Gorge, West Coast, New Zealand (circa 1911), now in the collection of the Museum of New Zealand Te Papa Tongarewa, and Otira Gorge (1912) in the collection of Auckland Art Gallery.

By 1894 van der Velden had taken on students, among whom were Sydney Thompson, Robert Procter, Cecil Kelly, Elizabeth Kelly, Leonard Booth, and Raymond McIntyre. His teaching method placed emphasis on acquiring an intimate acquaintance with the subject by doing a great many drawings and studies.

== Life and career in Australia ==
Van der Velden and family sailed to Sydney in April 1898. Little is known of his time in Sydney, although a work painted in Christchurch, Disillusioned (also known as The sorrowful future) was sold to the Art Gallery of New South Wales for £400.

Sophia van der Velden died in Australia on 1 May 1899. Van der Velden spent the first three months of 1901 living at the Carrington Hospital for Convalescents at Camden outside Sydney.

== Return to New Zealand and death ==
In Sydney van der Velden met his second wife, Australia Wahlberg. In January 1904 he and Australia departed for Wellington, New Zealand: they were married in Wellington two weeks after their arrival, on 4 February. Their son Noel was born on Christmas Day, 1905 but died 26 days later.

A second child, the couple's daughter Melba (named for Dame Nellie Melba, whom the painter greatly admired) was born in May. During a visit to Auckland van der Velden contracted bronchitis and died of heart failure on 11 November 1913. He was buried in an unmarked grave in Waikaraka cemetery; Australia and Melba van der Velden returned to Sydney in 1914.

== Gallery ==
Works by Petrus Van der Velden

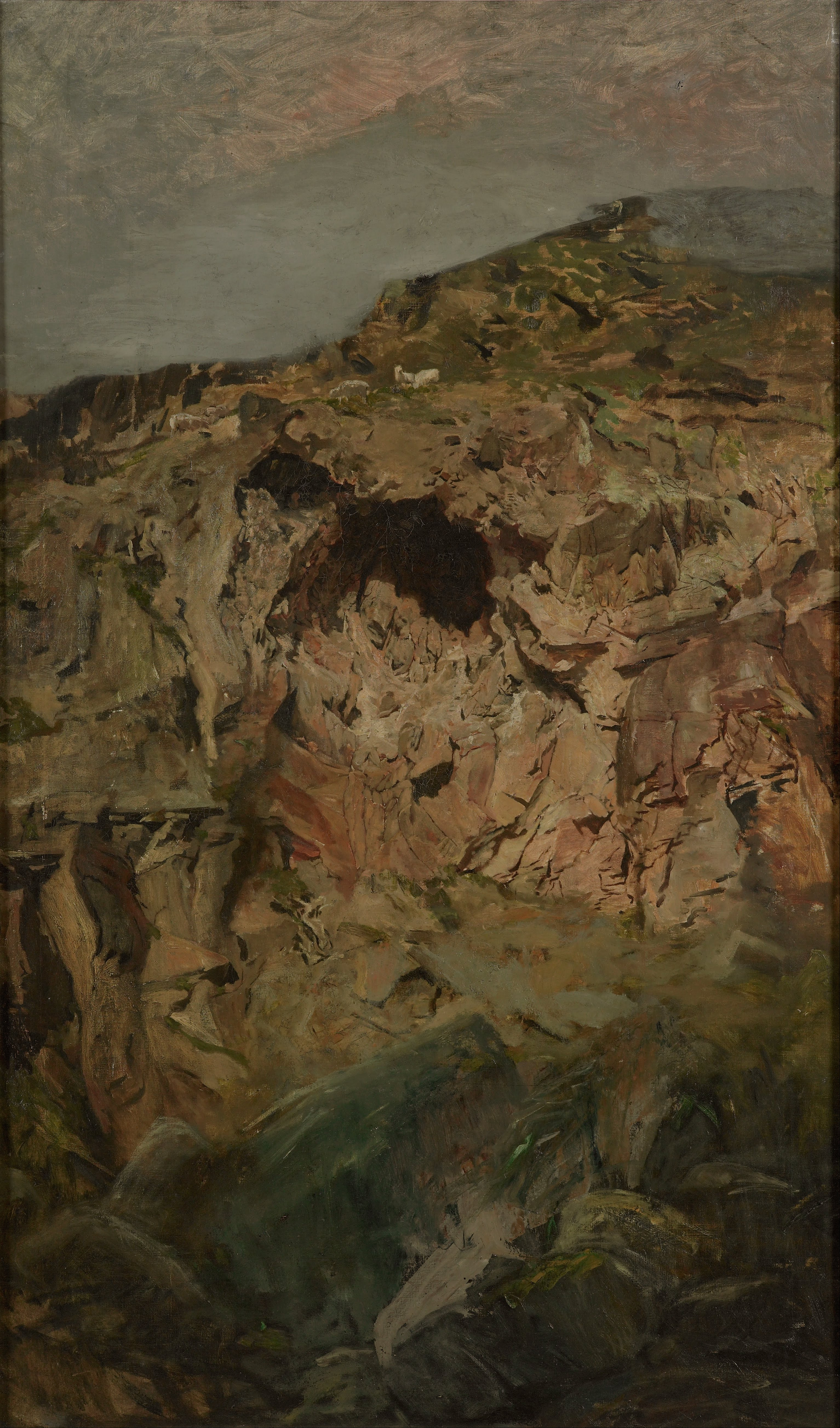
Rock study, circa 1890 (Te Papa, Wellington)

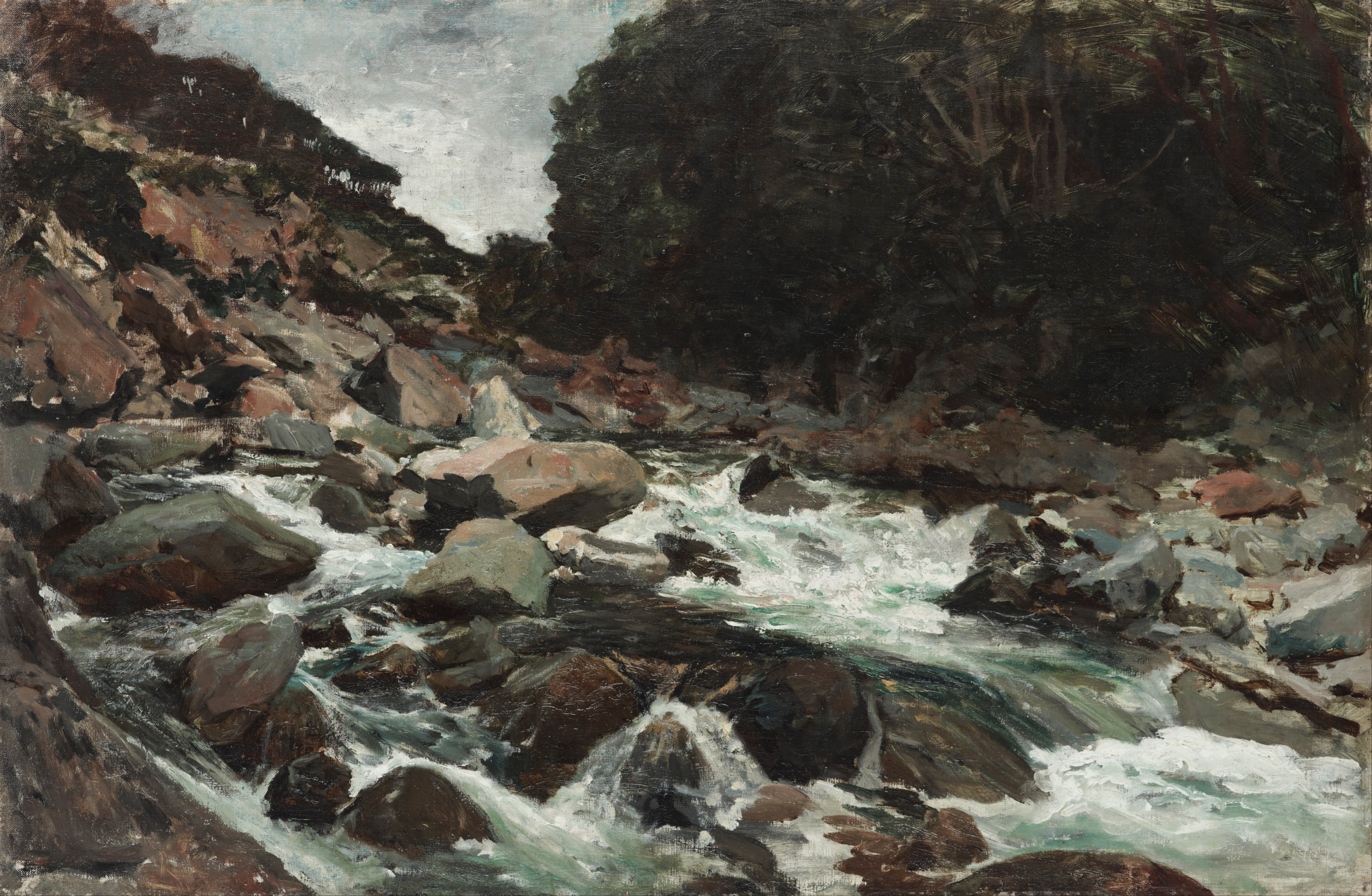
Mountain stream, Otira Gorge, circa 1893 (Te Papa, Wellington)

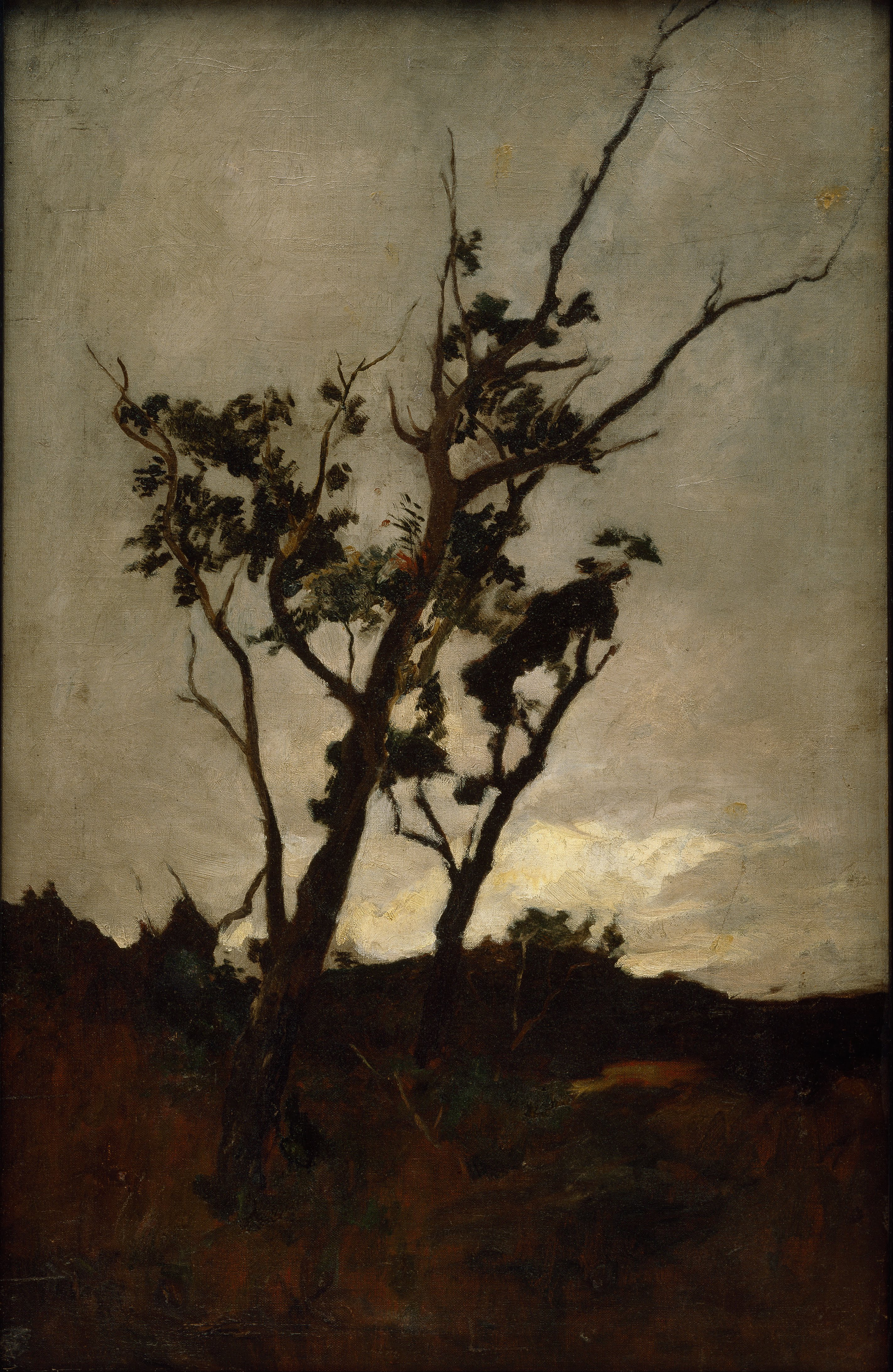
Tree study, 1893-1898 (Te Papa, Wellington)

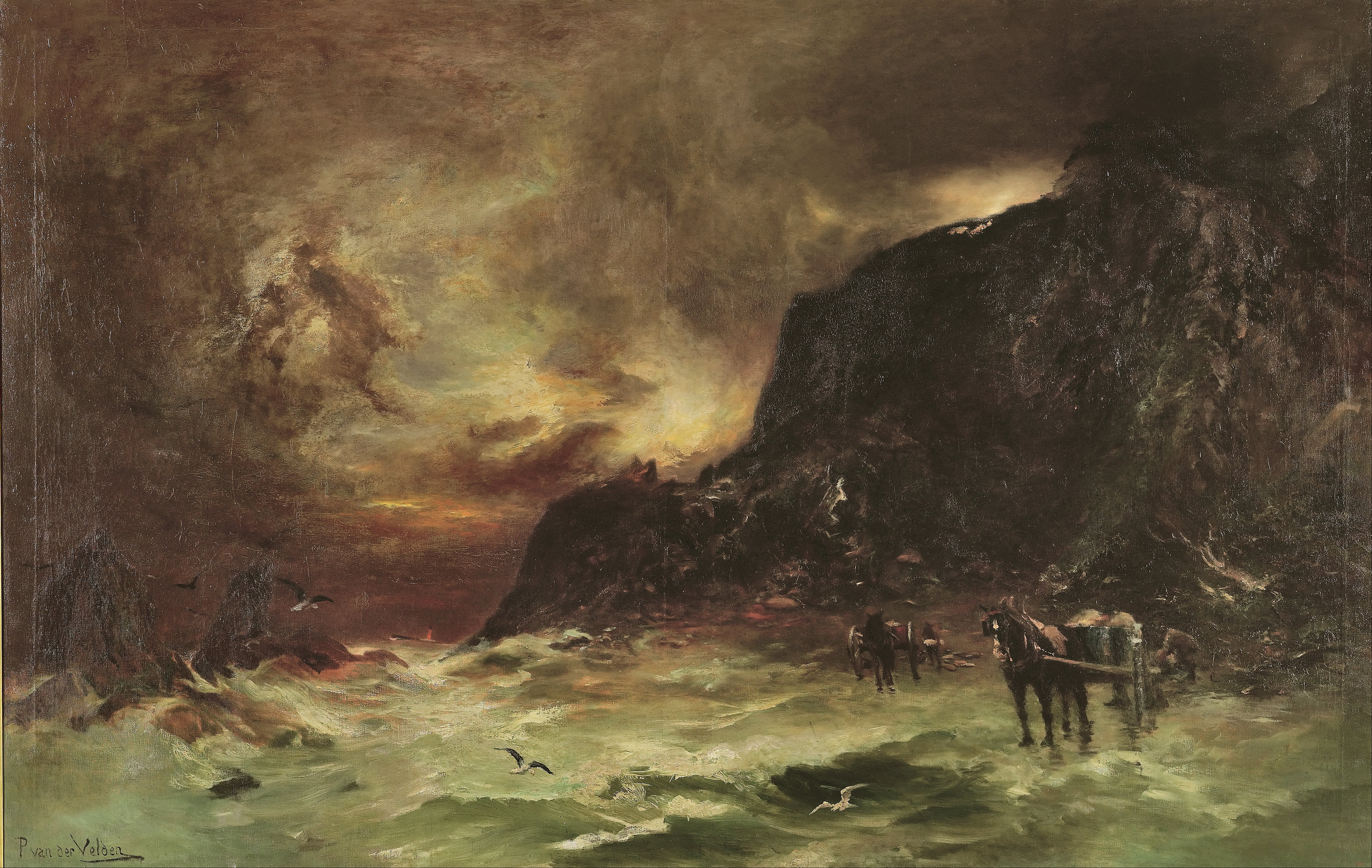
Storm at Wellington Heads, circa 1908 (Te Papa, Wellington)

== Further information ==
- Biography in 1966 Encyclopaedia of New Zealand
- Biography in Oxford Art Online
- Gordon H. Brown and Hamish Keith. An Introduction to New Zealand Painting 1839–1967. Auckland: Collins, 1969.
- T.L. Rodney Wilson, Petrus van der Velden: 1837–1913. Wellington: Reed, 1979.
- T.L. Rodney Wilson, Notes towards a van der Velden Mythology, Art New Zealand, no 4, February/March 1977
- T.L. Rodney Wilson, Petrus van der Velden: The Marken and Otira Series, Art New Zealand, no 1, August/September 1976
- Conserving Paintings: Petrus van der Velden’s Marken funeral barge video, Museum of New Zealand Te Papa Tongarewa
- Curator Rebecca Rice on Petrus van der Velden's Storm at Wellington Heads, Museum of New Zealand Te Papa Tongarewa
