= Emily Nutsey =

New Zealand nurse, civilian and army matron

Emily May Nutsey MBE RRC (1887–1953) was a New Zealand nurse, civilian and army matron. She was born in Christchurch, Canterbury, New Zealand in 1887.

She was appointed an Associate of the Royal Red Cross in 1918 and was promoted to Member of the Royal Red Cross in 1942. In 1935, she was awarded the King George V Silver Jubilee Medal and she was appointed a Member of the Order of the British Empire in the 1937 Coronation Honours.
