= John Hodson =

John Henry Hodson is an Anglican clergyman.

Hodson was born in Britain c. 1915, he graduated with the M.A. degree from Oxford University and was ordained as a priest in 1938. He was the curate of Kennington from 1937 to 1940 and priest-in-charge at Friar Park (Wednesbury) from 1940 to 1943.

Hodson served as a Royal Navy Chaplain from 1943 until 1946. After the Second World War he was the Vicar of Helmsley, Yorkshire. He emigrated to South Africa in 1953. He was the Dean of Grahamstown 1953 to 1964.

In 1980 he was admitted as a Brother of The Most Venerable Order of the Hospital of Saint John of Jerusalem.

== Notes ==
Anglican Church of Southern Africa titles
Preceded by Jimmy Beaufort	Dean of Grahamstown; 1953–1964	Succeeded by Kenneth Oram
