= Frank Crosse =

Church of England clergyman (1897–1979)

Frank Parker Crosse MC (24 October 1897 – 15 March 1979) was a British soldier and Church of England clergyman who became Dean of Grahamstown in South Africa, and was styled The Very Reverend Frank Crosse.

== Life ==
Educated at the Royal Military College, Sandhurst, early in the First World War Crosse was commissioned as a Second lieutenant into the South Staffordshire Regiment and in 1916 was awarded the Military Cross for conspicuous gallantry.

After the War he trained for the priesthood at Lincoln Theological College, was ordained deacon in 1923 and after a curacy in Bolsover he was vicar at Derry Hill, then at Branksome; and was later Rector of Barlborough and Morton. In 1934 he was appointed as Dean of Grahamstown Cathedral, also becoming its Archdeacon and Rural Dean.

Anglican Church of Southern Africa titles
Preceded by Edmund Blundell	Dean of Grahamstown; 1934–1944	Succeeded by Jimmy Beaufort
