= Anthony Mdletshe =

Anthony Thembinkosi Bonga Mdletshe was an Anglican bishop in South Africa at the end of the 20th century and the start of the 21st.

He was dean of Grahamstown from 1992 to 1993 then suffragan bishop of Grahamstown from 1993 to 1997; and bishop of Zululand from 1997 until 2005.

== Notes ==
Anglican Church of Southern Africa titles
Preceded by Roy Barker	Dean of Grahamstown; 1992–1993	Succeeded by Chich Hewitt
Preceded by Eric Pike	Suffragan Bishop of Grahamstown; 1993–1997	Succeeded by Bethlehem Nopece
Preceded by Peter Harker	Bishop of Zululand; 1997–2005	Succeeded by Dino Gabriel
