= Jimmy Beaufort =

New Zealand clergyman

James Morris Beaufort (1896 – 19 March 1952) was a New Zealand born Anglican clergyman who had an illustrious career in the Royal Flying Corps as a chaplain.

Morris was educated at Trinity College, Dublin and ordained after a period of study at Wells Theological College in 1921. After a curacy in Northenden he was Vicar of Hauraki Plains. He was the Headmaster of King's Preparatory School, Auckland, New Zealand. He was also a founder of St. Peter's School in Cambridge, New Zealand. After this he was Vicar of Shawbury then the Sub-Dean of St Alban's Cathedral. During World War II he was a Chaplain in the RAFVR.He served as Dean of Grahamstown from 1934 until his death on 19 March 1952 in Grahamstown. He was also Archdeacon of Grahamstown from 1944 until his death.

Anglican Church of Southern Africa titles
Preceded by Frank Crosse	Dean of Grahamstown; 1944–1952	Succeeded by John Hodson
