= Edith Tennent =

New Zealand nurse (1882–1946)

Edith Penelope Tennent MBE (25 July 1882 – 7 June 1946) was a New Zealand nurse and hospital matron.

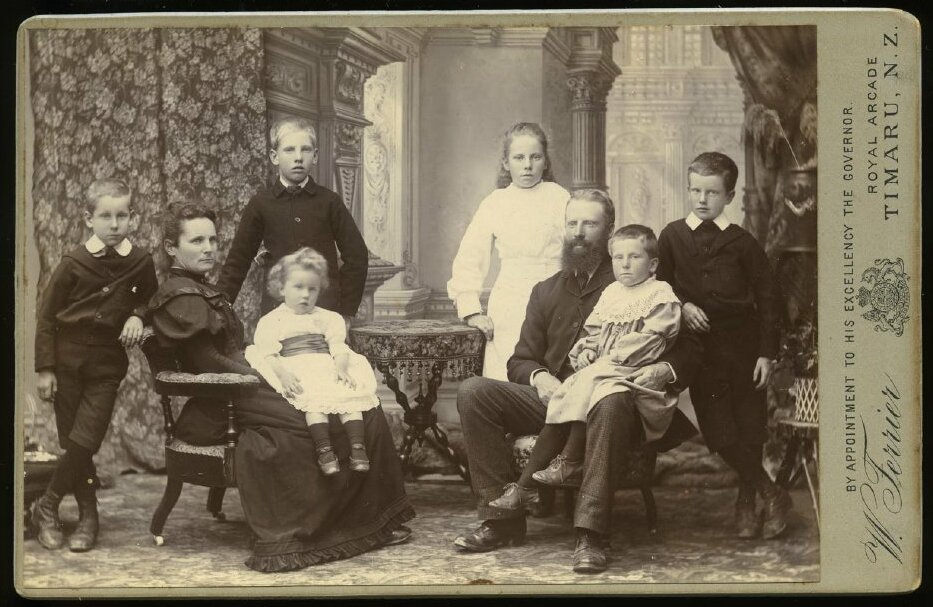
W J and K J Tennent and children, Timaru, New Zealand, February 1894. Pictured (left to right): Kenard, Kathleen (holding Sybil), Hobart, Edith, William (holding Ida), and Osward

== Early life and education ==
Tennent was born in Timaru, New Zealand, to William James Tennent and his wife Katherine Jane Kestervan. Her father was the secretary of the Timaru Harbour Board. Tennent was educated at Miss Hall's Private School in Timaru until 1902, when her parents moved to Marton in the North Island to start a business. In 1914 Tennent entered Wellington Hospital to begin her nursing training, graduating in 1918. She received the highest marks in New Zealand on her state registration examination.

== Career ==
On graduating, Tennent became a nursing sister at Wellington Hospital, and was appointed Assistant Matron in 1920. In 1922 she was given six months leave from her position to study midwifery; she passed the examinations with an equal-first in the country.

In 1925 she was appointed Matron of Dunedin Hospital. During her tenure, she encouraged nursing staff to undertake postgraduate studies in specialised fields, and to enrol in university courses.

Tennent was a member of the Otago Branch of Registered Nurses and Midwives, and was involved in revising the national syllabus for nursing training. She was also a member of the Dominion Executive of the Registered Nurses' Association from 1937 to 1942, and involved with the New Zealand Red Cross and the Patients' and Prisoners' Aid Society. In the 1937 Coronation Honours, she was appointed a Member of the Order of the British Empire, for services to nursing.

During World War II Tennent was appointed Commander-in-Chief of the New Zealand Red Cross Voluntary Aids and travelled throughout the country organising and training volunteers, advising on preparations for the establishment of emergency hospitals, and recruiting trained nurses to the organisation.

In 1942 she resigned due to ill health and died in Lower Hutt on 7 June 1946.
