= Bernard Williams (priest) =

English priest (1869–1943)

Bernard Williams was an Anglican priest. He was the son of the Rev. Henry Williams (1844–?). Bernard was born on 14 December 1869 at Croxton, Norfolk. He went to school at Bury St Edmunds and Norwich. He matriculated in 1889.

Williams was admitted to Christ's College, Cambridge on 4 April 1889 and graduated B.A. 1892 and M.A. 1898.

He was ordained deacon at Exeter in 1899 and priest in 1899. He served curacies at Chittlehampton, Devon (1899-1902) and at Indwe, Diocese of Grahamstown, (1902-6). His further career included:

- Priest Vicar of Grahamstown Cathedral, 1906–8.
- Priest-in-charge of St Saviour's, East London, 1908–14.
- Rector of East London, 1914–16.
- Dean, Archdeacon, and Rector of the Grahamstown Cathedral 1916–27.
- Vicar General of Grahamstown, 1920–7.
- Provost and Vicar of Portsmouth, 1927–30.
- Rural Dean of Portsmouth, 1928–30.
- Honorary Canon of Portsmouth, 1928–35.
- Rector of Buriton, Hampshire, 1930–5.

He died in Pietermaritzburg in 1943.

Anglican Church of Southern Africa titles
Preceded by Francis Phelps	Dean of Grahamstown; 1916 – 1927	Succeeded by Edmund Blundell
Church of England titles
New title	Provost of Portsmouth; 1927 – 1930	Succeeded by Thomas Heywood Masters
