= Sydney Thompson (artist) =

New Zealand painter (1877–1973)

Sydney Lough Thompson OBE (24 January 1877 – 8 June 1973) was a New Zealand artist.

== Family ==
Sydney Lough Thompson was born in Oxford, Canterbury, New Zealand, in 1877. He had eight siblings – five brothers and three sisters. His father had come to New Zealand as a young man and ran a general store in Oxford before becoming a sheep farmer. Thompson attended school until he was 13, after which he worked for his father on the farm.

== Early life and training ==
It was Petrus Van der Velden who first aroused Thompson's interest in art and in 1895 he enrolled as a student at the Canterbury College School of Art in Christchurch. Thompson also took lessons from Van der Velden. Van der Velden became a formative influence on Thompson and also encouraged Thompson's ambition to become an artist. Van Der Velden's influence can be seen in Thompson's portrait Lady Mclean (oil, 1907.) and also in The Crucifix (oil, 1902.).

== Move to Europe ==
In 1900, he went to London and then Paris in 1901 where he became influenced by the French painting schools of that time. He returned to New Zealand and became an instructor at the Canterbury College School of Art between 1906 and 1910.

On 28 March 1911, Thompson married Maude Ethel Coe at St Mary's Church in Irwell, Canterbury, and shortly afterwards, went abroad again to London and France. He spent a lot of time in Concarneau, France where he developed a taste for painting scenes outdoors.

He returned to New Zealand in 1923 but still divided his time between his home and Concarneau, France. In New Zealand he painted many landscapes adopting the styles he learnt while abroad. In November 1936, he was commissioned by the Lyttelton Harbour Board to produce a painting of the port to be presented to the Robert McDougall Art Gallery. He produced two versions of the painting, which he called Lyttelton Harbour from the Bridle Path, with the second one gifted by him to the harbour board in recognition of them recognising the importance of art. Thompson dedicated the second painting to Walter Kenneth McAlpine, the recently deceased chairman of the board, when he presented the gift in July 1937.

In the 1937 Coronation Honours, Thompson was appointed an Officer of the Order of the British Empire, for services to art. He died in Concarneau on 8 June 1973.

== Styles ==
Sydney Thompson was trained under the realism school prevalent in Western Europe at the latter part of the nineteenth century. Most of his earlier paintings depict still lifes and portraiture.

After his experiences in France, Sydney Thompson adopted a Post-Impressionistic style. His paintings became more colorful using more purer, brighter hues. His subject matter also changing to show the effects of outdoor light.
