= 1937 Coronation Honours (New Zealand) =

Awards list for New Zealand

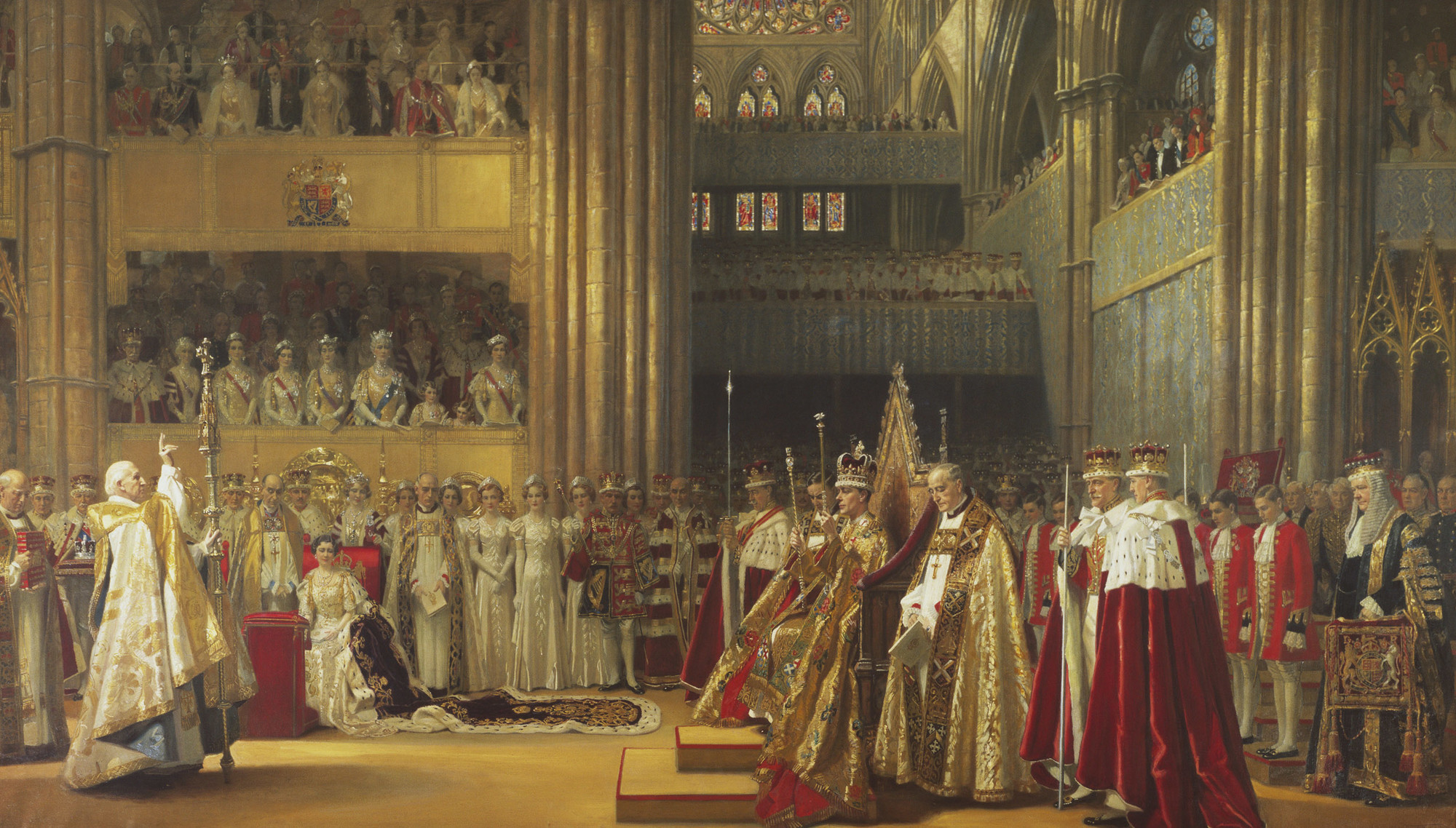
Coronation of George VI at Westminster Abbey on 12 May 1937

The 1937 Coronation Honours in New Zealand, celebrating the coronation of George VI, were appointments made by the King to various orders and honours to reward and highlight good works by New Zealanders. The honours were announced on 11 May 1937.

The recipients of honours are displayed here as they were styled before their new honour.

== Privy Counsellor (PC) ==
- George Vere Arundell, Viscount Galway GCMG DSO OBE – governor-general of New Zealand.
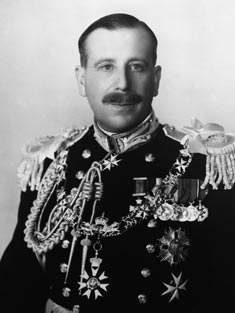
Viscount Galway

== Knight Bachelor ==
- Ernest Davis – mayor of the City of Auckland.
- Charles John Boyd Norwood – of Wellington. For public services.
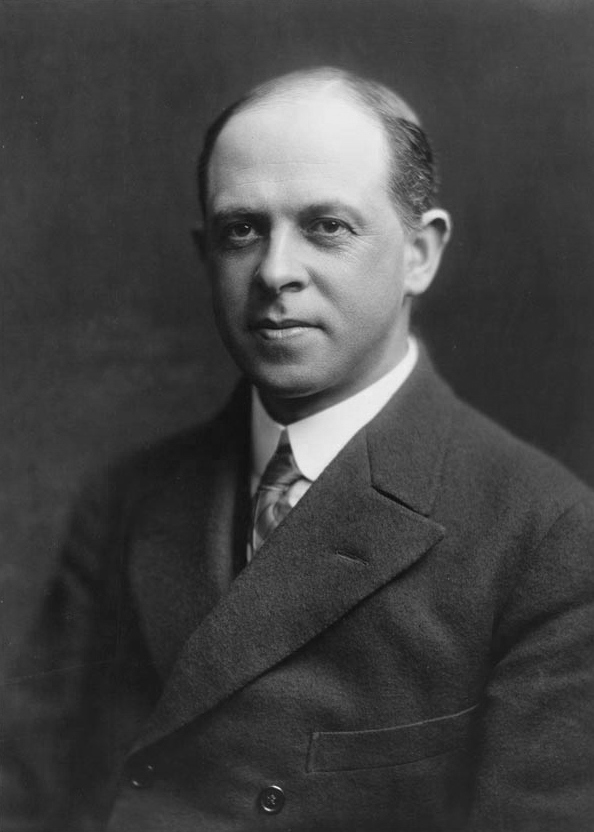
Sir Ernest Davis

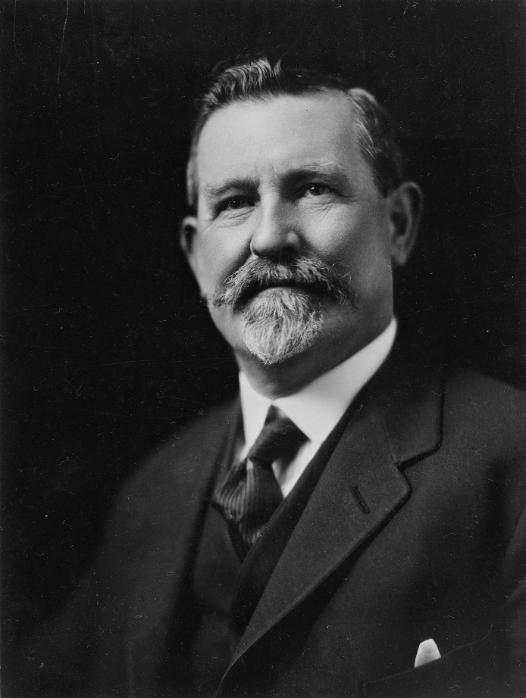
Sir Charles Norwood

== Order of the Bath ==
=== Companion (CB) ===
Military division, additional

- Rear-Admiral the Honourable Edmund Rupert Drummond MVO – Royal Navy; commodore commanding the New Zealand station.
- Major-General John Evelyn Duigan DSO MC – New Zealand Staff Corps; general officer commanding and chief of the general staff, New Zealand Military Forces.
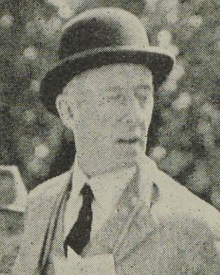
Edmund Drummond

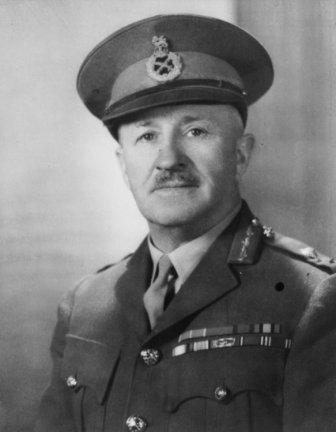
John Duigan

== Order of Saint Michael and Saint George ==
=== Knight Grand Gross (GCMG) ===
Additional

- The Right Honourable Sir Michael Myers KCMG – Chief Justice of New Zealand.
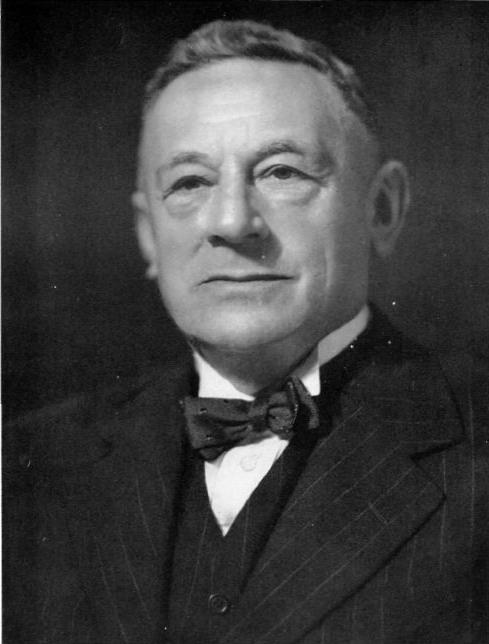
Sir Michael Myers

=== Knight Commander (KCMG) ===
Additional

- Algernon Phillips Withiel Thomas – emeritus professor, Auckland University College. For services to education.
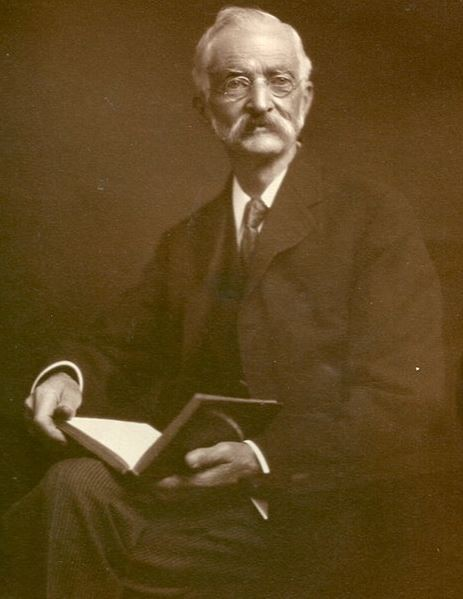
Sir Algernon Thomas

== Order of the British Empire ==
=== Commander (CBE) ===
Civil division, additional

- Te Puea Hērangi – of Ngāruawāhia; a Māori princess. For social-welfare services.
- Henry Ernest Moston – of Wellington; assistant secretary, Department of Labour.

Military division, additional

- Colonel Stephen Charles Phillip Nicholls DSO ADC – New Zealand Staff Corps; officer commanding, Southern Command, New Zealand Military Forces, Christchurch.
- Wing Commander Thomas Martin Wilkes MC ADC – Royal New Zealand Air Force; director air series and controller of civil aviation, Wellington.
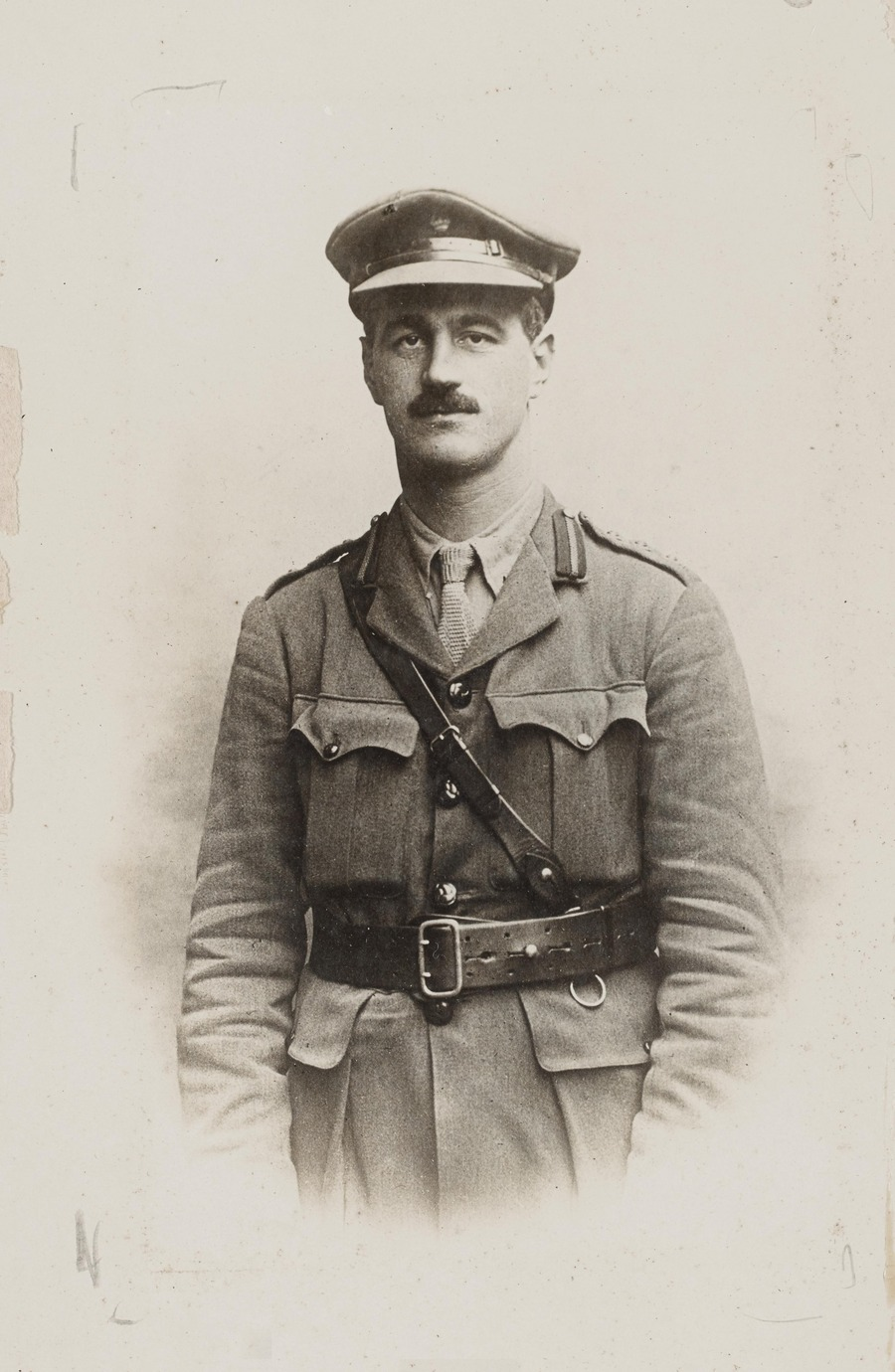
Thomas Wilkes

=== Officer (OBE) ===
Civil division, additional

- John Higgins – engineer, Grey County Council.
- Campbell Frederick Schadick – engineer, Buller County Council.
- Elizabeth Best Taylor JP – of Christchurch. For social-welfare services.
- Sydney Lough Thompson – of Christchurch. For services to art.
- Annie Maria Ward – of Lumsden; formerly president of the Women's Division of the New Zealand Farmers' Union.
- Helen Wilson – of Piopio; president of the Women's Division of the New Zealand Farmers' Union.

Military division, additional

- Paymaster-Commander Edward Loftus Tottenham – Royal Navy; naval secretary and member of the Naval Board.
- Lieutenant-Colonel Henry Beresford Maunsell ED – officer commanding, Wellington East Coast Mounted Rifles (Territorial Forces), New Zealand Military Forces.

=== Member (MBE) ===
Civil division, additional

- Mary Boyce – matron, St Helen's (Maternity) Hospital, Christchurch.
- Althea Harriet Cookson – matron, Wellington Public Hospital.
- Alicia Campbell Ingles – matron, Pukeora Sanatorium, Waipukurau.
- Ella Dorothy Winifred Leslie – nurse-inspector, Department of Health.
- Miriam Mayze – matron, Auckland Mental Hospital.
- Janet Morgan – matron, Alexandra Home (Maternity Hospital), Wellington.
- Rose Muir – matron, Christchurch Public Hospital (1916–1936).
- Clarissa Eliza McLaren – matron, Seacliff Mental Hospital.
- Emily May Nutsey ARRC – matron, Auckland Public Hospital.
- Edith Penelope Tennent – matron, Dunedin Public Hospital.

Military division, additional

- Warrant Officer Class II, Battery Sergeant-Major Walker Daniel Dean – Fifth Battery, New Zealand Artillery (Territorial Forces), New Zealand Military Forces.
- Warrant Officer Class II, Staff Sergeant-Major Charles Thomas Rae McLean – New Zealand Artillery, New Zealand Military Forces.

== Companion of the Imperial Service Order (ISO) ==
- Alfred Hyde Cockayne – of Wellington; director general, Department of Agriculture.
- James Havelock Jerram – of Wellington; general manager of the State Fire and Accident Insurance Office.
- Nelson Thomas Lambourne MA – of Wellington; Director of Education.
- William Robertson – of Wellington; under-secretary and land purchase controller, Department of Lands and Survey.
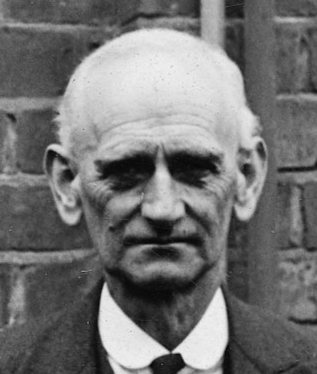
Alfred Cockayne

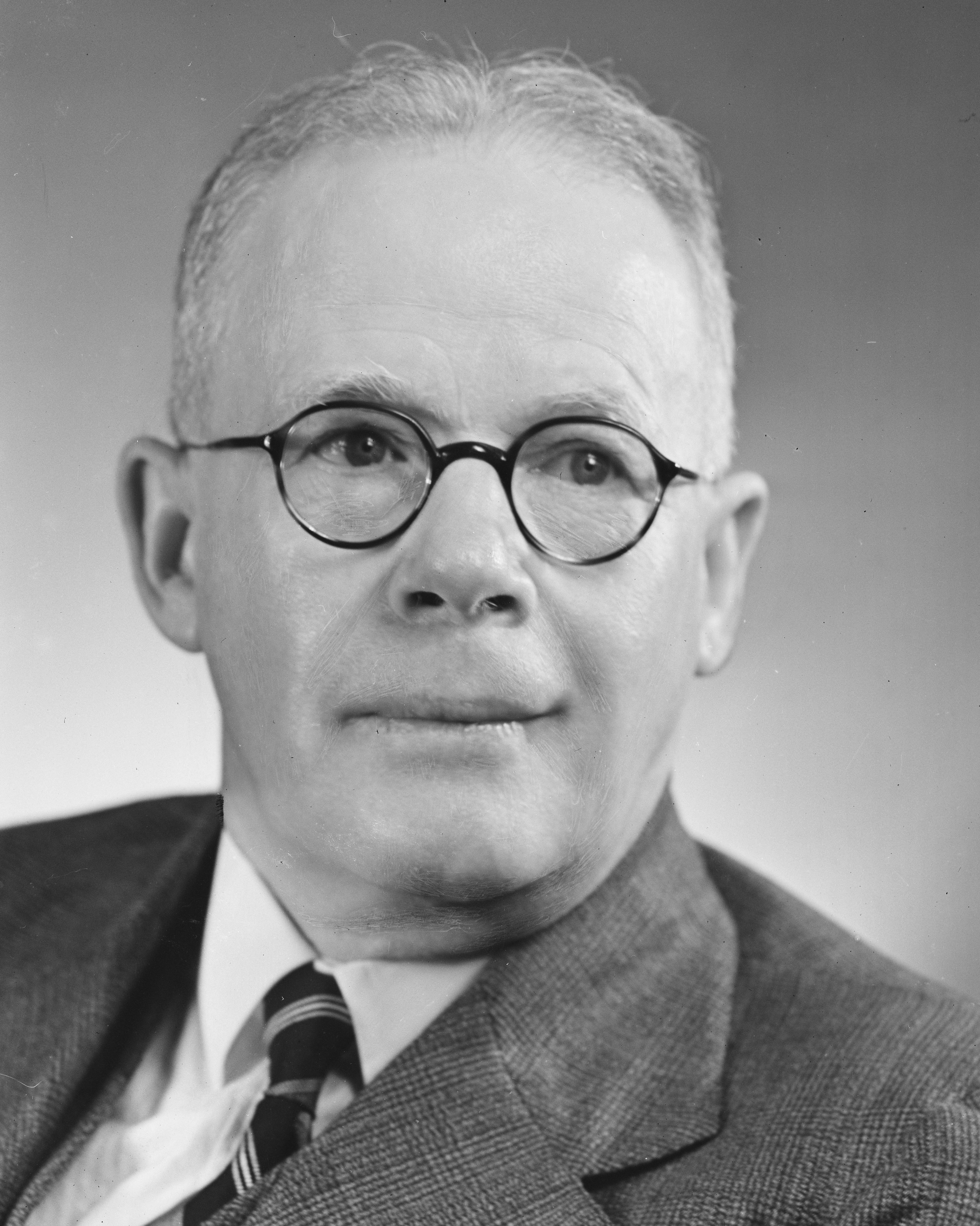
Nelson Lambourne
