= Francis Carter (priest) =

Anglican priest

The Very Reverend Francis Edward Carter
- Honorary Canon of St Edmondsbury and Ipswich
- Native name: 3
- Other post: Dean of Grahamstown

Orders
- Ordination: 1879

Personal details
- Born: 9 September 1851 Pewsey, Wiltshire, United Kingdom
- Died: 22 August 1935 (aged 83) Cambridge, England
- Denomination: Anglican
- Spouse: Sibella Fanny Sayer
- Education: B.A. 1875
- Alma mater: University of Cambridge

Francis Edward Carter (9 September 1851 – 22 August 1935) was an Anglican priest who served in Cornwall, Kent, East Anglia and South Africa. He died aged 83, at 13 Park Terrace, Cambridge.

== Early life ==
Francis Edward Carter was born in Pewsey, Wilts. on 9 September 1851; he was the son of Charles Henry Carter and went to school at Epsom College, Surrey, where he matriculated in 1871.

== University education and teaching career ==
Francis Edward Carter was admitted (as a sizar) to Trinity College, Cambridge on 22 April 1871, and graduated as follows; B.A. 1875; M.A. 1878.

He worked as an assistant master at The King's School, Canterbury, 1875–78.

== Ordained ministry ==
Carter was ordained a deacon in 1878 and a priest in Truro in 1879; he was curate of St Paul's Truro (1878–80). He served as prebendary of the Collegiate Church of Endellion (1880-4), canon missioner of Truro Cathedral (1884–95), Select Preacher at Cambridge (1888), Six Preacher and Tait Missioner at Canterbury Cathedral (1895–1900), and was an honorary canon of Canterbury Cathedral (1896–1900). In early 1900 he was offered the position of dean and rector of Grahamstown, South Africa, and accepted the office, travelling to the country in August that year. He stayed in South Africa until 1911, when he returned to become Rector of Hadleigh, Suffolk (1911–27) and dean of Bocking (1911–27), also serving as Rural Dean of Hadleigh, Suffolk (1912–24), Proctor in Convocation (1922-9) and honorary canon of St Edmondsbury and Ipswich (1922–35).

== Marital Status ==
In 1899, he married Sibella Fanny née Sayer: they had one son and one daughter.

== Published works ==
- Preaching. Longmans, Green & Company. 1909.
- The Truro Mission Hymn-book. Skeffington & Son. 1892.
