= James Clark (businessman) =

New Zealand mayor (1833–1898)

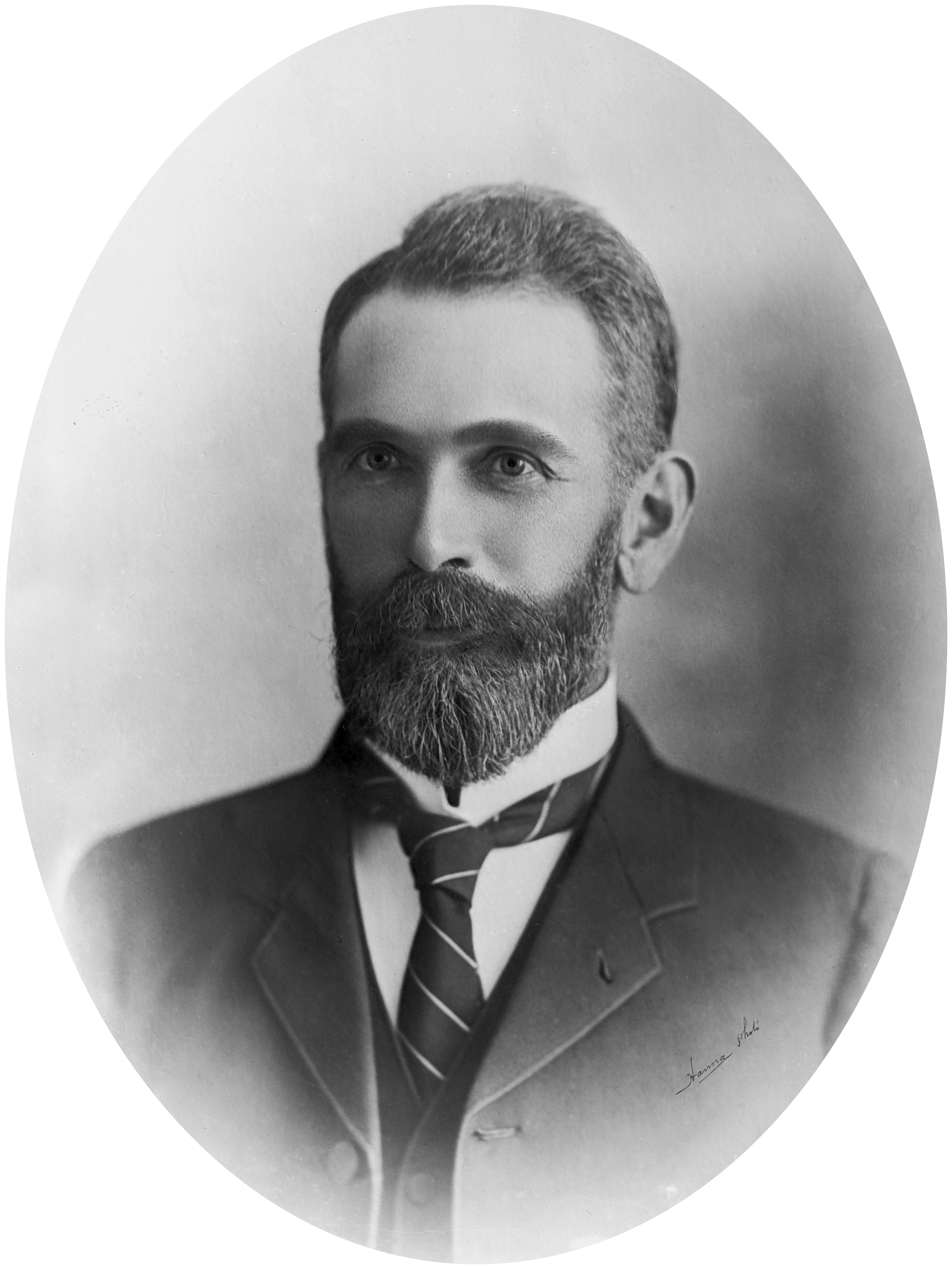
- James Clark in the 1880s

8th Mayor of Auckland City
- In office 1880–1883
- Preceded by: Thomas Peacock
- Succeeded by: William Waddel

Personal details
- Born: 12 August 1833 Beith, Scotland
- Died: 26 January 1898 (aged 64) England
- Party: Independent
- Spouse: Kate Woolnough (m. 1875)
- Relations: Archibald Clark (father)

James McCosh Clark (12 August 1833 – 26 January 1898) was Mayor of Auckland City in the 1880s. He was a successful businessman until many of his ventures failed during the depression of the 1880s, causing him to return to England for the last decade of his life. He was the son of Archibald Clark.

== Early life ==
Clark was born in Beith, Scotland, in 1833, the eldest son of the merchant Archibald Clark and his first wife, Margaret McCosh. He was educated at Largs. Archibald Clark decided to emigrate to New Zealand with his third wife and four children; the family left London on the barque Thames on 18 July 1849 and arrived in Auckland on 25 November. He joined the Volunteer Forces and was a captain in the Invasion of Waikato in 1863.

== Professional life ==
Clark joined his father's company as a partner in 1856 or 1857, and the company was renamed Archibald Clark and Sons. They manufactured clothing and were a wholesaler, at one time employing some 500 staff. Clark became the senior partner following his father's death in October 1875. He was involved in numerous other companies. His investment in the Moanataiari gold mining company made him a rich man. Moanataiari is now a suburb of Thames in the Coromandel.

Together with John Logan Campbell, Gustav von der Heyde, John Shera and others, Clark set up the New Zealand Freight Company in 1872, which amalgamated with the New Zealand Shipping Company the following year. All the Auckland shipping owners combined into one company in 1881, the Northern Steam Ship Company, of which Clark was appointed one of the directors. The depression in the second half of the 1880s affected this company, but Clark managed to secure the services of a new managing director in 1888 who could turn the situation around.

Clark was one of the financial backers of business entrepreneur Thomas Russell, who in 1859 had founded the New Zealand Insurance (NZI). The group of businessmen and companies behind Russell became known as the Limited Circle, and they were financing much of the development of Auckland. The funds came from the proceeds of the Thames gold rush. Members of the Limited Circle founded the Bank of New Zealand in 1861 and Clark was on the board of directors. He was president of the Auckland Chamber of Commerce in 1879–1881.

With Josiah Firth, Clark established the Te Aroha Battery Company, a gold mining company. It was one of the many speculative deals which did not go well, and the depression in the second half of the 1880s necessitated a sale, which was done in 1887 incurring a great loss. The Thames Valley and Rotorua Railway Company was another such venture; it built parts of the Rotorua and Kinleith branches before its collapse. While Archibald Clark and Sons prospered, several other of Clark's businesses failed, and having lost his high standing in society, he took his family back to England in 1889.

== Political career ==
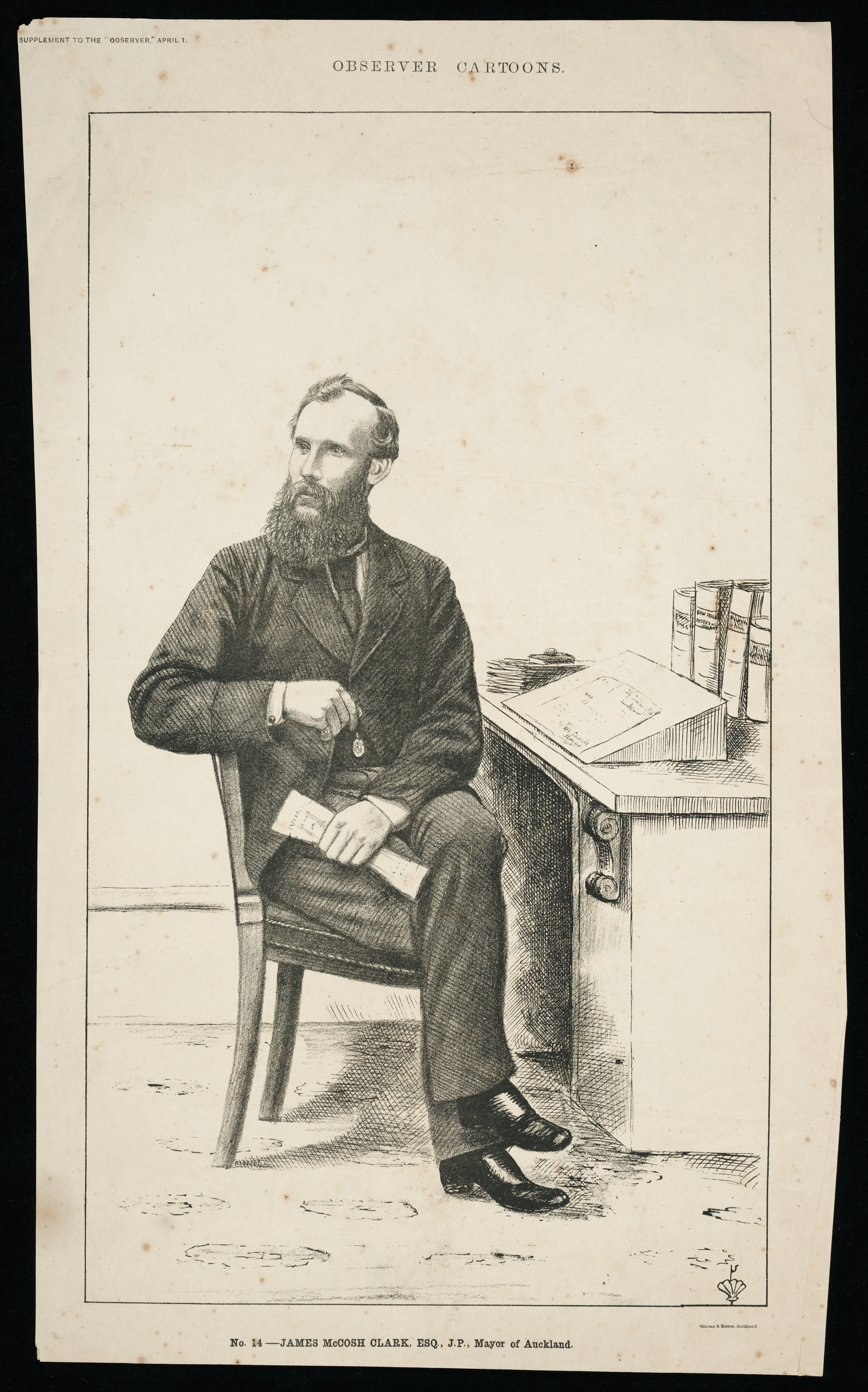
James McCosh Clark in 1882 during his time as Mayor of Auckland

Clark was a member of the Auckland Provincial Council, representing the Newton electorate on the 6th Council from December 1869 to September 1870.

He was Mayor of Auckland from 1880 to 1883. In November 1880, 1881 and 1882, respectively, he was elected unopposed on all occasions. During his term in Office, the first tramway (Horse drawn) was constructed and the site for the Auckland Town Hall was purchased. Clark's council also decided on the site of the library and art gallery, still occupied today by the Auckland Art Gallery. On retiring from the mayoralty, he was given a telescope in appreciation of his services. In 1886–1887, Clark represented the Grafton ward as a Councillor. Other local body roles included the chairmanship of the Auckland Harbour Board and of the Education Board.

Clark stood for Parliament on three occasions. In the 1875–1876 general election, he was nominated by Thomas Peacock, but unsuccessfully contested the Auckland East electorate against William Lee Rees, polling 266 votes against 300. Clark then contested the Auckland East electorate in the 1879 general election against William Speight and was narrowly defeated with 363 to 371 votes.

Clark was re-elected mayor in 1881 and declared that he would not stand in the 1881 general election, as he could not do justice to both commitments, but he changed his mind when it was announced that Sir George Grey would stand in Auckland East. It is said that Clark did not intend to be elected, he merely stood to oppose and defeat Grey. The results were 349 and 315 votes for Grey and Clark, respectively, and Grey was declared elected with a majority of 34 votes.

== Private life ==
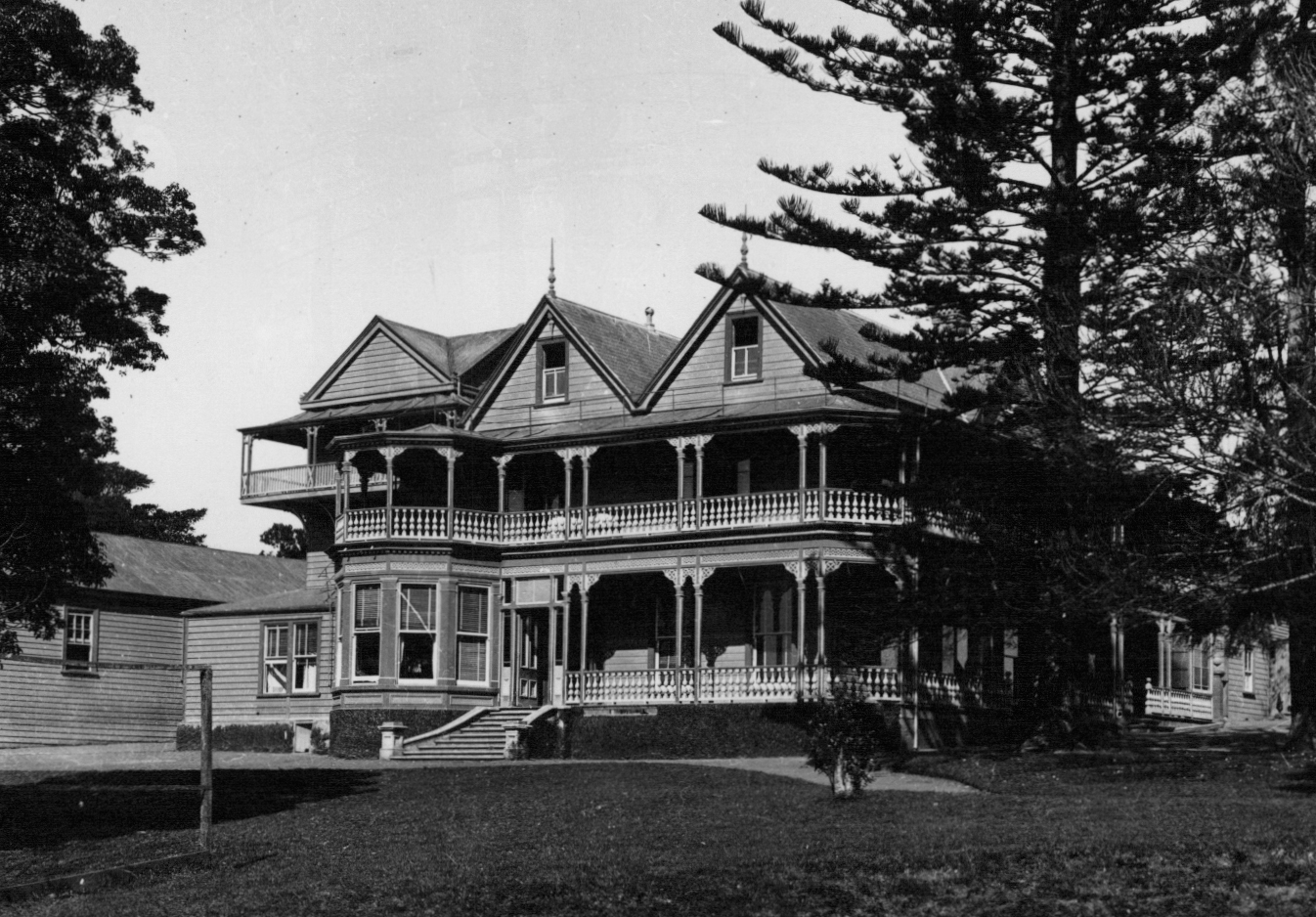
Clark's residence, The Tower, photographed in 1915, before becoming part of the King's School campus

Clark was active in the Presbyterian Church and was the national treasurer for ten years from 1862. In 1865, he purchased The Tower, a large house in Remuera, as his residence. The building is these days part of King's School.

He married Kate Emma Woolnough on 8 April 1875 in Melbourne. Two days later, on a Saturday, the Auckland premises of Archibald Clark and Sons were closed to give staff the opportunity to celebrate the wedding. His wife had studied art and lived in London, earning a living by undertaking research for writers. After her marriage, along with painting and authoring childrens books, Kate became an important organiser and contributor to charitable organisations in Auckland. Their first son was born on 28 December 1875, and they went on to have five children together.

After many of Clark's businesses had failed, the family migrated to London. In London, his wife wrote one of the first New Zealand children's books, A Southern Cross Fairy Tale, which she partly illustrated, published in London in 1891. Her last work Maori Tales and Legends (1896), was intended to interest and instruct young people about New Zealand and Māori people. In early 1898, they were making plans to return to New Zealand.

== Death ==
Clark died on 26 January 1898 at St Leonards-on-Sea. He was survived by his wife and his five children. His wife returned to New Zealand in 1900 and died at Auckland on 3 November 1926.

Political offices
Preceded by Thomas Peacock	Mayor of Auckland City; 1880–1883	Succeeded by William Waddel

== Notes ==
Political offices
Preceded by Thomas Peacock	Mayor of Auckland City; 1880–1883	Succeeded by William Waddel
