= Roy Barker (priest) =

Roy Thomas Barker (1933 – 28 October 2011) was dean of Grahamstown from 1980 until 1992.

Barker was educated at King's College London and Warminster Theological College; and ordained in 1959. After curacies in Leeds he was chaplain at the University of Cape Town from 1966 until 1972. He was then sub dean of Cape Town from 1973 until his appointment in Grahamstown.

Barker died on 28 October 2011.

Anglican Church of Southern Africa titles
Preceded by Godfrey Ashby	Dean of Grahamstown; 1980–1992	Succeeded by Anthony Mdletshe
