= Edmund Blundell (priest) =

Edmund Keith Blundell (1886–1961) was an Anglican clergyman in South Africa.

== Personal life ==
Blundell was born on 11 November 1886 in Twickenham, Middlesex to Charles and Emma Gertrude Blundell He was baptised on 22 July 1887 at Richmond upon Thames

In 1911 he lived at 7 Vicars' Close, Wells where he was a student of theology. During World War I he was an Army Chaplain and after the war he relinquished his commission

He married Dorothy Cathcart, eldest daughter of Mr. and Mrs. Francis G. C. Graham in Grahamstown in 1916.

== Education ==
Blundell was educated at King's College, Wimbledon; Selwyn College, Cambridge; and Wells Theological College.

== Ecclesiastical career ==
After ordination his first post was a curacy at St James, Fulham. He was the Warden at St Paul's College, Grahamstown from 1915 to 1916 and then Curate at Claremont, Cape Town. He was then a Chaplain to the Forces until peace returned. Following this he was Rector of King William's Town until 1928 when he became Dean of Grahamstown, a post he held until 1934. He presided over the 1931 synod of the Diocese of Grahamstown as Vicar-General. He was Vicar of St Paul's Church, Leicester from 1933 to 1938; Rector of St Aidan, Yeoville from 1938 to 1944; and then of St George, Parktown from 1945 to 1952 (both in Johannesburg); and finally of Vanderbijlpark from 1952 to 1953.

=== Personal recollection of Dean Blundell ===
Transcribed from a notebook of undated newspaper clippings saved by Doris Thomas Thacher, who grew up in Grahamstown.

In the Cathedral Church of S. S. Michael and George on Saturday afternoon a fashionable and interesting wedding was solemnised, when the Rev. Edmund Keith Blundell, son of Mr. Charles Blundell, of Richmond, Surrey, was married to Dorothy Cathcart, eldest daughter of Mr. and Mrs. Francis G. C. Graham, of Grahamstown. When the bride, who wore a gown of French white corded silk, entered the church, tastefully decorated with white flowers, there was a large congregation. The Bishop of Grahamstown, the Right Rev. Dr. Phelps, officiated. The service was fully choral, the hymns being beautifully sung by the choir. Mr. Douglas Tayler, F.R.C.O., presided at the organ, playing the opening bars of the Wedding March while the register was being signed in the vestry. The bride, who was given away by her father, was attended by the Misses Lovell and Winfred Graham (sisters) and Miss Ruth Graham (cousin), Miss Nonie Roussouw and Miss Helen Mullins acting as flower girls. Upon the Rev. J. S. Bazeley, Warden of St. Paul's devolved the duties of best man, Mr. Reginald Graham and Mr. Geoffrey Brown acting as groomsmen. At the conclusion of the ceremony a reception was held at the residence of the bride's mother, Kincardine, West Hill. This was largely attended, among the guests being, the Judge-President, the Bishop of Grahamstown, the Dean of Grahamstown, the Solicitor-General and the Principal of St. Andrew's College. The presents were both numerous and handsome. The health of the bride and bridegroom, who left by the night train for Camps Bay, was proposed by the Bishop. Their future home will be in Claremont Cape Peninsula, whither they carry with them the best wishes of a very wide circle of friends.

Anglican Church of Southern Africa titles
Preceded by Bernard Williams	Dean of Grahamstown; 1928–1933	Succeeded by Frank Crosse
