= Elsie Mary Griffin =

New Zealand botany teacher, community organisation administrator

Elsie Mary Griffin (1 November 1884 – 3 May 1968) was a New Zealand botany teacher and community organisation administrator. She was born in Lawrence, South Otago, New Zealand, on 1 November 1884.

== Biography ==
Elsie Mary Griffin was married to Cornelius Griffin, a Wesleyan minister. The Griffins moved to Auckland province when she was 16 years old. Elsie Griffin had attended the Methodist Prince Albert College in Queen Street, Auckland, and in 1906 she was awarded an MA with honours in botany from Auckland University College. In that year she took up a position as the botany mistress at Auckland Girls' Grammar School. Elsie Griffin took her pupils on long hikes in the Waitākere Ranges so that they could collect specimens. She was described as a lively and enthusiastic woman, and characteristics that enabled her to get along with her students successfully. While she was a teacher she became involved with the Young Women's Christian Association in Auckland. In 1908 she helped form a study group composed of university graduates. In 1910 she led a Bible study circle and served on the Evangelistic Committee. She was the secretary of the YWCA in Dunedin from 1912 to 1915, and it was this experience that led her to spend the next two years studying social work methods in America. In 1917 she returned to Auckland to serve as the secretary of the local YWCA.
