= King's School, Auckland =

King's School

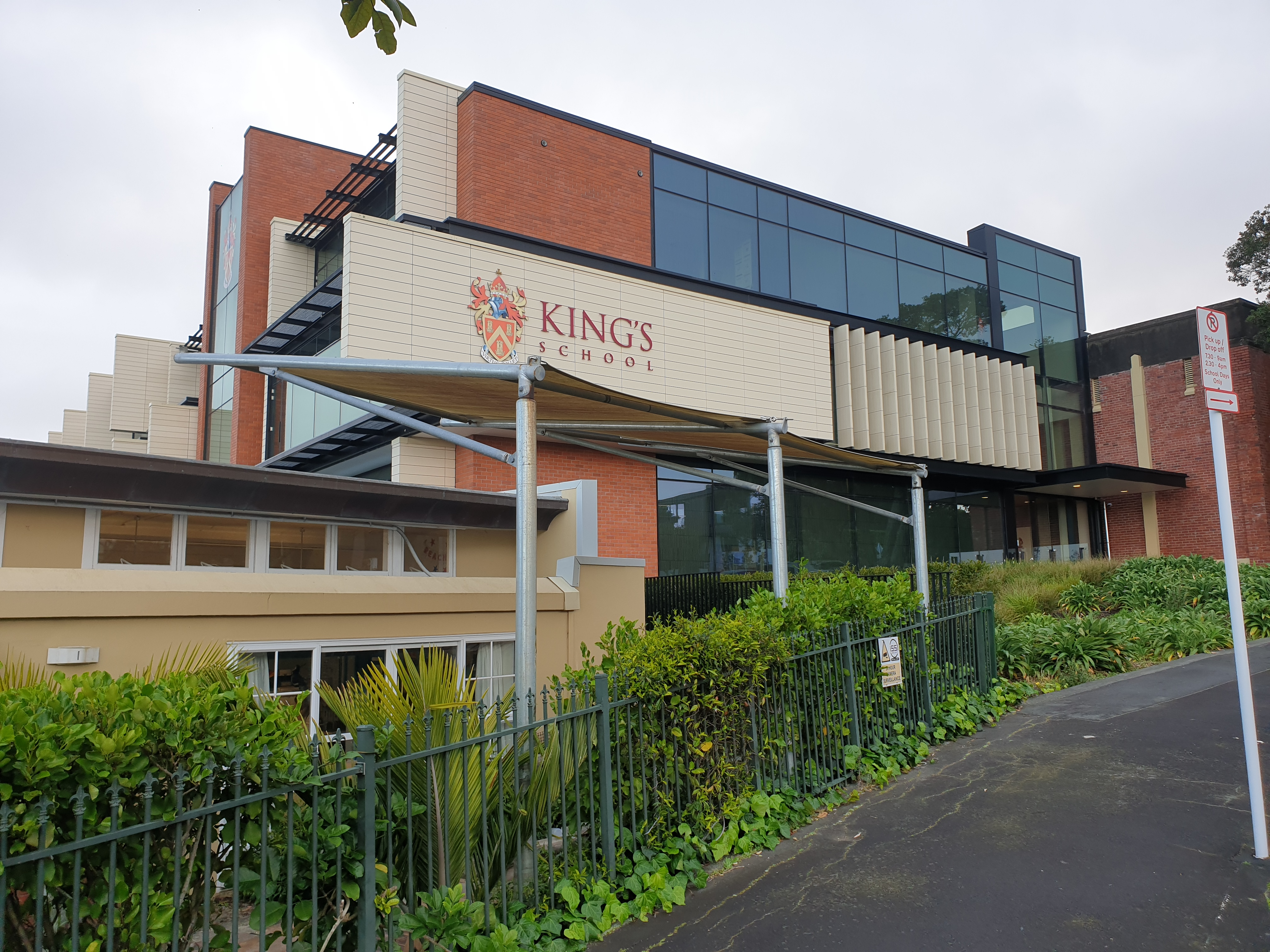

Location
- 258–272 Remuera Road, Remuera, Auckland; 36.8791°S 174.7929°E

Information
- Type: Private Boys
- Motto: Latin: Virtus Pollet ("Noble Conduct Prevails")
- Established: 1922
- Ministry of Education Institution no.: 4116
- Headmaster: Tony Sissons
- Enrolment: 761 (July 2026)
- Socio-economic decile: 10
- Website: kings.school.nz

King's School is a primary school for boys from the Early Learning Centre (4-years-old) to Year 8 (13-years-old). It is situated in Auckland, New Zealand, and it also has strong links to the Anglican church; the Anglican Bishop of Auckland and the Dean of Auckland are permanent members of the school's Board Of Governors. The school sits on the former site of King's College and was established there on 6 June 1922 when the College moved to its current site in the South Auckland region of Otahuhu. Boys at King's School are offered a variety of curriculum activities. These include mathematics, literacy (written language and reading), social sciences, religious education (RE), physical education (PE), science, technology, art, music, drama, band and French.

== History ==
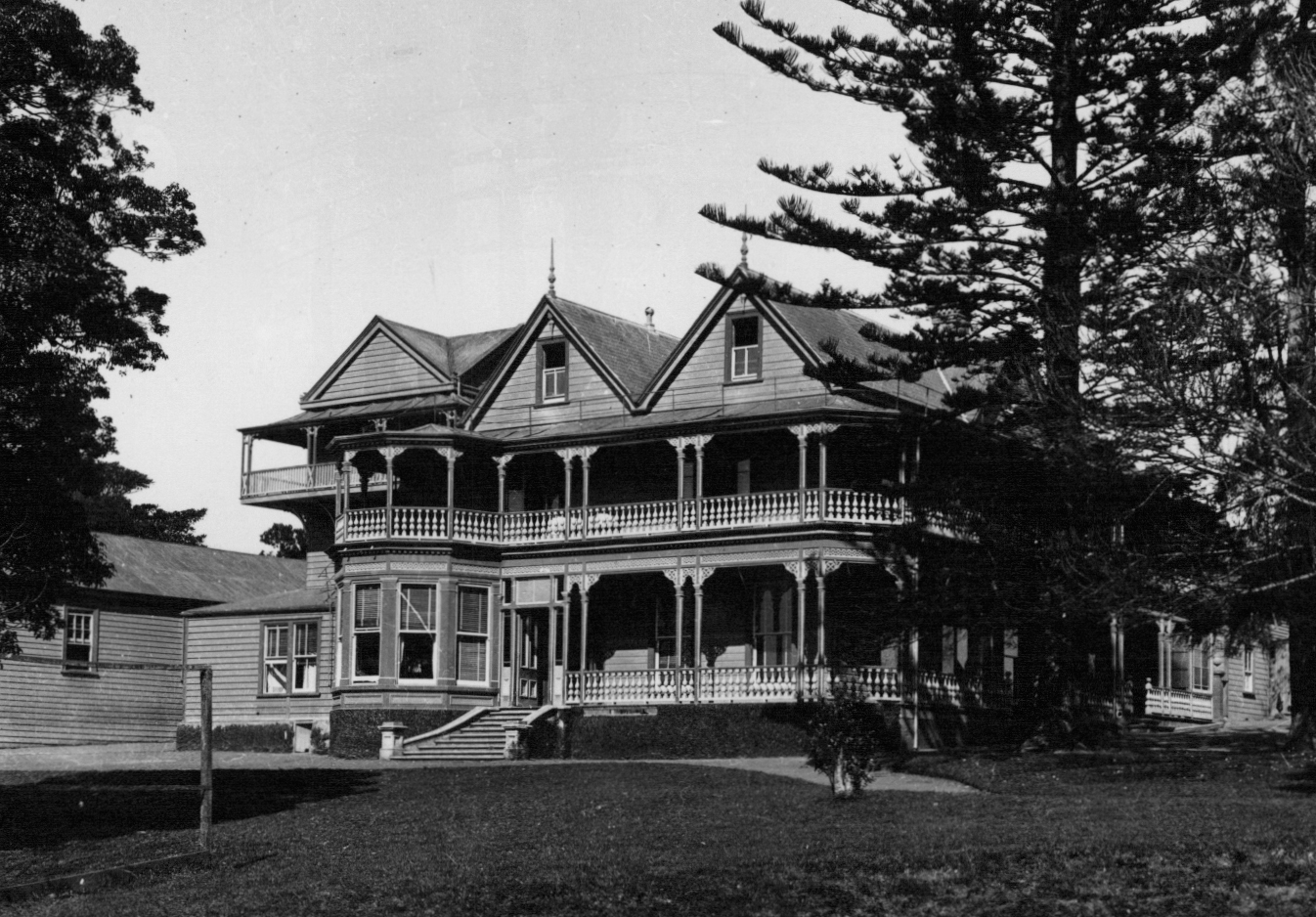
"The Tower", home of James McCosh Clark in 1915, before becoming part of the King's School campus

The school was registered as "King’s Preparatory School Auckland" in 1921 and opened on 6 June 1922 with 164 boys, after the King’s College Secondary Department moved to Middlemore. The King's College headmaster, Colonel Charles Thomas Major, passed the site in Remuera to the newly formed King’s School Board of Governors, and continued to play an active role at the school. The site was formerly the residence of businessman and Auckland City Mayor James Clark, and was home to a large home known as The Tower, which remains a part of the King's School campus.

=== 1922–1930 ===
The first Chairman of the Board of Governors was Professor H S Dettman and the first Headmaster was A Clifton-Smith, who arrived from The Hutchins School. In 1927 Lt-Col T H Dawson, took over as Board Chairman and J G T Castle succeeded Clifton-Smith as Headmaster. The original stables were converted into a school chapel dedicated in 1928 by A W Averill, Archbishop of New Zealand and officially named The Chapel of the Holy Child.

=== 1931–1940 ===
In 1931 J M Beaufort was appointed Headmaster and the school roll had dropped to 141 with 34 boarders. 1934 saw Colonel Charles Major take control of the school, after the resignation of Beaufort, pending the arrival of his son-in-law, John Morris in 1936. During these difficult times the school was run in conjunction with King's College. Bishop Averill was appointed as Chairman of the Board of Governors in 1935. In 1936 Colonel Major took over the Chairman position, the new Hanna Block was built and John Morris became headmaster. In 1938 S J Hanna became Chairman of the Board of Governors. Charles Major died in London in November.

=== 1941–1960 ===
During the war years the school roll continued to rise reaching 260 with 76 boarders in 1943. The same year saw the return of the Headmaster from war service. In 1949 a new, enlarged swimming pool was opened and the school roll was now at 275 including 87 boarders. The construction of the War Memorial Hall commenced in 1954 and was completed in 1955, dedicated by the Bishop of Auckland, Bishop Simkin. In 1959 the roll was at 317 with 104 boarders.

=== 1961–1980 ===
In 1961 Dr D L Richwhite began his 13-year term as Chairman of the Board of Governors. The following year saw the creation of 'The Friends of King’s School', originally called 'The King’s School Association'. The resignation of John Morris as Headmaster after 30 years service and the appointment of R J Pengelly as his successor occurred in 1965. In 1967 the first major development appeal was launched to fund the construction of the Kerridge Block. In 1974 Dr D L Richwhite retired as Board Chairman. The new 25-metre swimming pool was also completed and dedicated. The first year of weekly boarding was 1979.

=== 1981–1990 ===
The King’s School Foundation was formed in 1984. In 1986 a Friends’ Gala Day raised $66,000 towards the construction of the pavilion to be later known as the Arthur Lennan Pavilion situated above No. 2 Field. Pengelly retired after 22 years as Headmaster in 1987 and was replaced by B M Butler the long-standing Headmaster of Huntley School. The Greening of King’s Appeal launched to fund the construction of an Astro Turf playing field on the site of the No 1 field. The school roll was now 575.

Pengelly was dismissed in 1987.

=== 1991–1999 ===
1992 was the last year of boarding. The boarding house closed and the two remaining dormitories on the top floor of the Hanna Block were converted into classrooms. In 1993 further extensions to the Chapel included a new south annex with the nave being extended and the addition of a choir changing room. The dedication of the new extensions was performed by Old Boy, Bishop Bruce Gilberd on 13 June. The new technology centre was opened in 1994 occupying the area of the former assembly hall/gymnasium. 1997 was the 75th anniversary of the opening of the school, and the JR Fletcher Performing Arts Centre was dedicated by the Bishop of Auckland and Board Member, John Paterson. The King’s School Old Boys’ Association was launched with Simon Moore the Inaugural President.

=== 2000-2010 ===
In 2000, Bret Butler retired after 12 years as Headmaster. At the commencement of Term 2 (2000) Neil McWhannell took over as Headmaster. The Aquadome was officially opened by Sir Edmund Hillary on Friday 20 July 2001. At the end of the year Neil McWhannell retired and returned to Australia. In 2002 Harvey Rees-Thomas was appointed headmaster for a year to allow the Board of Governors to carry out a search for the new headmaster. Tony Sissons took over as the 10th Headmaster of King’s School in 2003. In 2005, the school deemed it necessary to lengthen the school day from 7:50am – 3:00pm to 7:50am – 3:40pm due to time restrictions with the timetable. Construction of the Light House Project was started at the beginning of 2006 and was officially opened in August 2007. Work began on the Sportsdome in February 2008 and was completed in Term 3 2008.

=== 2011-Present ===
A new building block called the Centennial Building replaced the old Hanna Block, which was demolished in 2016 due to the sandstone foundation being unstable, a direct result of New Zealand building safety standards increasing after the 2011 Christchurch Earthquake. The Centennial Building consists of 4 storeys. Construction was completed in late 2017 and was opened in Term 1 of 2018. The building was named after the school's centenary which was celebrated in June 2022. In March 2023, a flag pole at the Centennial Block entrance to the school was revealed to coincide with King Charles III's Coronation and a Union Jack was flown until the Monday following the Coronation.

== Headmasters ==
- A Clifton-Smith 1922–1927
- J G T Castle 1927–1931
- J M Beaufort 1931–1934
- Colonel Charles Thomas Major 1934–1936
- John Morris 1936–1965

== Notable alumni ==
- George Tupou V, King of Tonga
- Henry Lamb Kennedy, Member of the Legislative Council of Fiji

== House system ==
The school incorporates a house system with six separate houses; this system is used for sports competition and friendly rivalry among the students and staff alike. The houses compete each year for the Shale House Trophy and the Collins Shield for Sport. Each house, in conjunction to the school colour of maroon, also has a corresponding colour:

- Averill – named after Archbishop of New Zealand, Alfred Averill – Yellow.
- Bruce – named after founder of King's College, Graham Bruce – Royal / Navy Blue.
- Major – named after Col. Charles Thomas Major – Red.
- Marsden – named after the first Anglican missionary to NZ, Samuel Marsden – Cambridge Blue.
- Morris – named after Headmaster John Morris – Brown.
- Selwyn – named after Archbishop of New Zealand George Augustus Selwyn – Green.

== Coat of arms ==
Coat of arms of King's School
Notes In 1963 the governors of the school entered into discussions with Portcullis Pursuivant as to acquiring an official coat of arms (The school had previously used an assumed coat of arms). The Arms of King's School were subsequently granted by the College of Arms in September 1966. Crest On a wreath of the Colours a Conical Cap Gules turned up Ermine encircled by an Ancient Crown Or and Ensigned by a Cross formy fitchy Argent tied about the foot and pendant on either side a cord twisted Gules and Or the Tassels Or Escutcheon Gules a Chevron between three Towers each issuant from an Ancient Crown a Bordure Or Motto Virtus Pollet ('Character Prevails')
