= Chich Hewitt =

South African clergyman

Christopher James Chichele "Chich" Hewitt (born 1945) is an Anglican cleric. He was dean of Grahamstown from 1993 to 1998; and also archdeacon of Grahamstown during the same period.

Hewitt was born in 1945, educated at the University of the Witwatersrand and ordained in 1979. His first post was as chaplain at St Paul's College Grahamstown. After many years in South Africa he came to England in 1999 as Team Rector of Radcliffe, serving for a decade. He was then at Holy Rood, Swinton until 2014. He is now retired.

== Notes ==
Anglican Church of Southern Africa titles
Preceded by Anthony Mdletshe	Dean of Grahamstown; 1993–1998	Succeeded by John Stubbs
