= Andrew Hunter (priest) =

South African priest

Andrew John Hunter (born 3 June 1957) was Dean of Grahamstown from 2008 to 2021. He also served as Archdeacon of Grahamstown for part of that period. When he stepped down as Dean, he was to date the longest serving Dean in the history of the Cathedral.

Hunter was born in Pietermaritzburg and educated at the University of Cape Town, St Paul's College, Grahamstown, the University of the Western Cape, Cardiff University and the Nelson Mandela University where he obtained a DPhil in Conflict Management and Transformation in April 2019. Before being appointed dean he was rector of St Peter the Fisherman, Hout Bay. Former parishes include Church of the Resurrection, Bonteheuwel, and St John's, Kayamandi.

Hunter's last parish before retirement was St Faith's, Plumstead, in the diocese of Cape Town.

He retired from active ministry in June 2023.

Hunter is an accredited mediator with Conflict Dynamics. He is currently involved in pro bono mediation work at the Wynberg Magistrates Court, in the maintenance, domestic violence and harassment divisions.

During his time in Grahamstown, Hunter sat on the councils of

- St. Andrew's College, Grahamstown
- The College of the Transfiguration
- The Biko Bowcott Charitable Trust Foundation

== Family ==
His paternal grandfather was John Hunter, bishop of George, having been translated from Kimberley and Kuruman.

He is married to The Reverend Dr Claire Gabrielle Nye Hunter, and they have two adult daughters, Rachel Nye Hunter and Nicola Claire Wilkinson (Dr Nicola Hunter).

== Notes ==
Anglican Church of Southern Africa titles
Preceded by John Stubbs	Dean of Grahamstown; 2008–2021	Incumbent
