= John Stubbs (priest) =

South African Anglican priest (1952–2021)

Rev. Canon Dr. John Derek Stubbs (3 September 1952 – 16 August 2021) was the dean of studies of the Anglican Church of Southern Africa from 1991 until 1999, and thereafter he was the dean and archdeacon of Grahamstown, from 1999 until 2006. Prior to 1991, Stubbs worked as a priest at the Church of the Heavenly Rest, in New York City.

Stubbs matriculated at King Edward VII School (known as 'KES'), in Johannesburg, South Africa. After matriculating, Stubbs studied engineering, before being called to serve the Anglican and Episcopalian Church, first as a lay youth leader, founder and co-chairperson of the Nomads and, subsequently, as a priest.

Stubbs was forced to relocate to the United States in 1980 as a result of the apartheid laws that applied in South Africa at the time, which criminalized his marriage to Nommso Ngodwane (due to this fact, he and his wife were married in secret, in Lesotho, before fleeing the country).

Stubbs was detained for engaging in anti-apartheid activities at the infamous 'Old Fort' prison (in which Nelson Mandela and Mahatma Gandhi, among many others, were prisoners), which is now the site of South Africa's highest appellate court. While Stubbs was in the United States, he obtained degrees from the General Theological Seminary and Union Theological Seminary, both of which are situated in New York City.

Stubbs was ordained as an Anglican priest by Archbishop Desmond Tutu in 1984, under whom he would later serve in the Anglican Church of Southern Africa. He returned to South Africa from the United States in 1991. While working as a dean and archdeacon in Cape Town and Grahamstown (now Makhanda), respectively, he obtained a Ph.D. from the University of South Africa, titled “An investigation of synoptic history and style by means of a comprehensive assessment of syntax chains”, which explores how grammatical structures within texts can offer insights into the origins and authorship of those texts.

Stubbs had a working proficiency in Ancient Hebrew and Ancient Greek, among other languages. He returned to the United States after his second stint in South Africa, where, among other positions, he served as the Incumbent Rector at Trinity Episcopal Church, Whitinsville, Massachusetts. He retired from the priesthood after serving in the latter position. He died on August 16, 2021, and was honored in a number of memorial services, including one held in the Cathedral of St Michael and St George.

Stubbs was a father to two sons, an adopted daughter and two stepsons.

Anglican Church of Southern Africa titles
Preceded by Chich Hewitt	Dean of Grahamstown; 1999–2007	Succeeded by Andrew Hunter
