= Ethiopian movement =

Social movement arising at the end of 19th century in southern Africa

The Ethiopian movement is a religious movement that began in southern Africa towards the end of the 19th and early 20th century, when two groups broke away from the Anglican and Methodist churches. Reasons for breaking away included anti-black racism, racial segregation and Eurocentrism in these churches. Meanwhile, many people of African descent who found themselves in the Americas due to slavery found solace in the Biblical passage (Psalm 68:31):

Princes shall come out of Egypt; Ethiopia shall soon stretch out her hands unto God.

— Psalm 68:31

This verse suggested a future in which Africans could self-govern, and allowed a sense of shared culture and history to develop among black Christians in the Americas. Contact between black churches in southern Africa and the Americas allowed ideas to be subsequently shared between them. The movement was especially focused on the history of Africa before European colonization and combined both European and African ideas.

The term was later given a much wider interpretation by Bengt Sundkler, referring to all African-led churches which had broken away from European Protestant groups. His book, Bantu Prophets in South Africa, was the first comprehensive study of these African Initiated Churches (AICs).

== History ==
In 1888, an evangelist, Joseph Mathunye Kanyane Napo, seceded from the Anglican Church to form the Africa Church or African Church, which was composed of Anglicans who were dissatisfied with race-based control of the Anglican Church. Kanyane Napo's Church was established in Marabastad, Pretoria and was the first intertribal church formed and led by Africans in South Africa. Napo created the African Church to prove that there could be an entirely African church built without the help of the missionary, and kept the liturgical style of worship and doctrines found in Anglican churches.

In 1892, former first head of African ministers in Pretoria, Mangena Maake Mokone, decided to form a new branch and formed the Ethiopian Church, in South Africa, mainly because of dissatisfaction with racial segregation in the church and the lack of fellowship between black and white ministers. His preachings included the theme of "Africa for the Africans", which was later a pillar of the UNIA-ACL.

A group of former Anglican and Methodist leaders gathered around Mokone, including Kanyane Napo, Samuel James Brander, James Mata Dwane and several others. Two relatives of Mokone, Kate and Charlotte Maneye were studying at Wilberforce University in America, and Kate wrote to Mokone to tell him about the African Methodist Episcopal Church, which her sister Charlotte had joined. This led the Ethiopian Church to decide to join the African Methodist Episcopal Church (AME Church) in 1896, and Rev. Mokone, James Mata Dwane, and J G Xaba went to the US to negotiate the union. They ended up signing the negotiation and successfully merged the two churches, this allowed South Africans of the parish to go to America to study.

Over time Dwane, who had previously worked to build the Ethiopian Church, found issues with the relations between the church and their new partners, the African Methodist Episcopal Church. He disliked the paternal presence of the AME Church and began to found his own following known as the Order of Ethiopia. He led followers of the Ethiopian Church away into the new denomination with his teachings which would ally with the Anglican Church of the Province. Dwane is said to have done this due to his desire to become a bishop within this church, however he never did, and many of his original followers left when they realized they would be allying with the Anglican Church of the Province, a "white church". The Order of Ethiopia soon became composed predominantly of Xhosan people, and had little variety of followers unlike the Ethiopian Church from which they separated.

Charlotte Maneye married the Revd Marshall Maxeke, and they did missionary work for the AME Church in South Africa, and in 1908 they founded the Wilberforce Institute in the Transvaal, modelled on her American alma mater.

Many of the original Ethiopianist leaders, however, became dissatisfied with the AME Church, and found Black American domination of the church leadership as irksome as White British domination.^{1} They felt that there was little difference between the black American domination and that of missionary churches where African churchgoers had little to no say in the congregation, which was the entire reason for forming new branches of churches in the first place. In 1904 Samuel James Brander formed the Ethiopian Catholic Church in Zion, which combined the Anglican and Methodist strands of the Ethiopian tradition. It initially included Kanyane Napo and Daniel William Alexander among its leaders, but both of them appear to have later broken away to revive Napo's African Church. During the period 1900–1920 many different Ethiopian denominations were formed, which were heirs of the Ethiopian tradition.

== Ethiopianism ==
Ethiopianism was not an ideology, a theological school, or a political program. It was rather a cluster of ideas and traditions about being Christian in Africa that were shared by a group of Christian leaders in the period from 1890–1920. These ideas and traditions focused on the history of Africa before European colonization and taught Afro-Atlantic teachings, meaning they brought together the religious ideas of both the Europeans and the Africans. There was no sharp boundary to the movement, but it shaded off into other groups.

Features of the Ethiopian movement included:

1. the use of the name Ethiopia, Ethiopian, Cush or Cushite in the names of churches
2. the aim of a united African Christianity, based on the idea that "Ethiopia shall stretch out its hands to God"
3. Anglican-Methodist ecclesiastical polity and theology
4. In spite of many schisms, the Ethiopianist leaders formed a network, and interacted with each other more than they did with leaders of other traditions

Writers like Bengt Sundkler used Ethiopian in a wider sense to include all African independent church denominations that had broken away from Western-initiated Protestant groups like the Presbyterians, Congregationalists and Baptists, as well as the Anglicans and Methodists.

Sundkler therefore classified bodies like the African Congregational Church and Zulu Congregational Church as "Ethiopian", though they did not really participate in the Ethiopian movement itself. The independent churches of the Congregational tradition formed a separate network from the Ethiopian one, with less contact between the networks.

== See also ==
- Marcus Garvey
- UNIA-ACL
- Order of Ethiopia
- African-initiated Churches
- Ethiopia
- South Africa
- Alexander Bedward
- Ethiopian Renaissance

== Notes ==
1. Ethiopianist refers to those who adhered to the ideas of Ethiopianism, and is related to but is its own unique entity; from those who live in Ethiopia, and or who belong to the Ethiopian Orthodox Tewahedo Church
2. Ethiopianism is considered by scholars to be the origin of the Rastafari movement, and William David Spencer (author of Dread Jesus) suggests that its theological goal, popularized by Marcus Garvey, was that God is black.
