= Sophia Gray Memorial Lecture and Exhibition =

The Sophia Gray Memorial Lecture is an annual lecture series hosted by the Department of Architecture at the University of the Free State in Bloemfontein, South Africa.

Established in 1989, it is considered the longest-running annual architectural lecture series in the country.

The lecture honours the legacy of Sophia Gray, regarded as South Africa's first woman architect, and is awarded each year to a distinguished architect or practice who has made a significant contribution to the field.

Each laureate delivers a public lecture and is the subject of an accompanying retrospective exhibition.

== Significance ==
The Sophia Gray Memorial Lecture is recognised as the longest-running annual architectural lecture series in South Africa.

It has provided a consistent platform for architects to reflect on their work in relation to broader cultural, social, and environmental issues.

Each lecture is accompanied by an exhibition and frequently results in published material, contributing to the documentation of contemporary South African architecture.

Over more than three decades, the series has highlighted established voices, and is regarded as a key event in shaping architectural discourse in the country.

== Laureates ==
Since its inception , the lecture has been awarded annually to a distinguished architect or practice, each of whom delivers a public lecture accompanied by a retrospective exhibition of their work.

- 2025 – Heinrich and Ilze Wolff: Seeking Sunshine
- 2024 – Andre Eksteen & Braam de Villiers: In the Making of Meaningful Things
- 2023 – Nadia Tromp: Shifting Perception: Designing Dignity
- 2022 – Mphethi Morojele: Changing Landscapes Practice and Pedagogy
- 2021 – Lucien Le Grange: Architects and Urban Planners
- 2019 – Jon Jacobson: In[de]finite
- 2018 – Ora Joubert: La Promenade Architecturale
- 2017 – Elphick Proome Architects: Evolution
- 2016 – Al Stratford: Reductive Innovation in Architecture
- 2015 – Anton Roodt: Big Dreams in a Small City: Places of Memory, Spaces of Imagination
- 2014 – Mashabane Rose Architects: Landscape, History and Context
- 2013 – Kate Otten: Architecture for Every Day
- 2012 – Stan Field: For the Love of Architecture
- 2011 – Peter Rich: Learnt in Translation
- 2010 – Jaco Wasserfall: No Graffiti, Please! Stultorum Calami Carbones Moenia Charae
- 2009 – Walter Peters: More Ways of Being an Architect
- 2008 – Van Der Merwe Miszewski Architects (VDMMA): Van Der Merwe Miszewski Projects
- 2007 – Jo Noero: The Expedient and the Ethical, the Everyday and the Extraordinary
- 2006 – Designworkshop:SA: Borrowing Space and Time
- 2005 – Bannie Britz: Stories...Architecture...Life
- 2004 – Paul Mikula: A Great Big Box Called Architecture
- 2003 – Peter Buchanan: Architecture of the Emergent Epoch
- 2002 – Louis Karol: 50 Years in the City
- 2001 – Hentie Louw: Architecture and Craft: A Working Relationship?
- 2000 – Stanley Saitowitz: Expanded Architecture
- 1999 – Jack Diamond: Practicing Scales
- 1998 – Adele Naude Santos: "Narrative Maps": Concepts and Creations
- 1997 – Revel Fox: Reflections on the Making of Space
- 1996 – Pancho Guedes: Seven Manifestoes
- 1995 – Hannes Meiring: Architecture – The Great Adventure
- 1994 – Jack Barnett: Building the Best – The New South Africa's Essential Mission
- 1993 – Glen Gallagher: The Exclusion of Conclusion in Architecture
- 1992 – Willie Meyer: The Three Pasts to Our Present
- 1991 – Gawie Fagan: Architect and Community
- 1990 – Roelof Uytenboogaardt: Timeless in Architecture
- 1989 – Mira Fassler-Kamstra: Mimicry and Camouflage (Inspiration and Interpretation of Southern African Architecture)
