= YLC =

YLC may refer to:

- The Young Life Capernaum, a non-profit organization catering to people with special needs
- The Young Liberals of Canada, the national youth wing of the Liberal Party of Canada
- The Youth Leadership Camp, an annual four-week leadership program for deaf high school students in the United States
- Kimmirut Airport, the IATA code for the airport in Nunavut, Canada
- The Yemen Language Center in Sana'a, Yemen
- The Young Leadership Council in New Orleans, Louisiana, United States
- The Young Leaders Conference, a leadership program for high school freshmen of the National Hispanic Institute
- Young Life Creationism, a subgroup of Old Earth Creationism
- A US Navy hull classification symbol: Salvage lift craft (YLC)
