= Joyce Piliso-Seroke =

South African educator and activist (born 1933)

Joyce Piliso-Seroke GCOB
- Born: Joyce Notemba Piliso; 11 July 1933 (age 93); Crown Mines, Johannesburg, Transvaal (now Gauteng)
- Education: University Education Diploma, South African Native College
- Occupations: Educator, activist
- Organization: World YWCA
- Spouse: Theodore Seroke
- Honours: Order of the Baobab in Gold, Order of Simon of Cyrene

Joyce Notemba Piliso-Seroke (née Piliso; born 11 July 1933) is a South-African educator, activist, feminist and community organizer. A former vice president of the World YWCA, she traveled internationally to speak about the effects of apartheid, overcoming imprisonment and attempted censorship in her pursuit of justice and gender equality.

She is a member of South Africa's national Order of the Baobab in Gold, and was appointed the first chair of the South African Commission for Gender Equality.

== Early life and education ==
Joyce Notemba Piliso was born on 11 July 1933 in Crown Mines, Johannesburg, Transvaal (now Gauteng). Her father, Hannie Booi (H.B.), was a mine superviser and chief of the Jwara clan. Her mother Maude was both a teacher and an activist focused on women's rights and issues, and for several years Piliso's mother was also her teacher at school.

Piliso encountered racism from a young age: when shopping with her family in Mayfair, white Afrikaner shopkeepers would address her mother as "girl". More than once, when Piliso walked home with milk from the dairy, local white boys would set their dogs on her, laughing as she ran away. At the same time, she grew up surrounded by community activists and organizers. Guests at the Piliso family home often included students and activists such as Oliver Tambo and Nelson Mandela, who stayed with the Pilisos on their way to other destinations. Piliso's mother was good friends with activist Madie Hall Xuma.

Piliso graduated from Kilnerton High School in Pretoria. She studied at the South African Native College at Fort Hare next, earning her University Education Diploma in 1956. At the predominantly male school of Fort Hare, she learned to speak up for herself during meetings of the African National Congress Youth League, where she and other women students had to verbally support each other to overcome attempts at intimidation by male students. After graduation, Piliso-Seroke worked as a teacher at Wilberforce Institute at Evaton, but quit and decided to pursue social work instead. With financial help from the Institute of Race Relations, she traveled to Europe and completed a postgraduate course in Social Policy and Administration in Swansea, South Wales.

While at Fort Hare, Piliso met another student named Theodore Seroke, and after dating for many years they were married in 1969. Their daughter Michelle was born in 1971.

== Career and community work ==
=== During apartheid ===
Returning to South Africa after her studies, Piliso-Seroke took a job with the Young Women's Christian Association (YWCA) in Durban, Natal (now the province of KwaZulu-Natal). This work soon led her to develop her skills as a community organizer, teaching women to become active in political discussions. Although the YWCA offered a variety of community programs for women, the organization's work was hindered by the 1891 Bantu Code, which kept many African women in the legal position of minors, controlled by male relatives. The YWCA staff began a petition in support of abolishing the law, but this was not successful. Afterwards, they developed the Women Empowerment Programme to teach South African women how to safeguard their personal property through the creation of simple wills.

Soon, Piliso-Seroke was promoted to national secretary of YWCA, and she began travelling to international YWCA conferences to speak about her experiences with apartheid. In 1975, she became a member of the executive committee of the World YWCA in Geneva, Switzerland, and remained in that position until 1976. That year, the Soweto Uprising took place in South Africa. When Piliso-Seroke and the rest of the executive committee visited Soweto afterwards, they were detained for four days at the Orlando Police Station.

In 1979, Piliso-Seroke became a trustee for the Maggie Magaba Trust, an initiative created by white South African filmmaker Betty Wolpert to assist black women in Soweto. The Trust made educational bursaries available and supported poor families in improving their situations. Piliso-Seroke and Wolpert became close friends and allies, and they assisted each other in expanding personal networks of international contacts. While Piliso-Seroke travelled to Europe at first, her trips ended when her passport was confiscated by the South African Special Branch. She could no longer travel abroad to speak about apartheid. Her solution was to produce two documentaries with Wolpert — who was living in England and still had freedom to travel — and these documentaries were subsequently shown abroad. The films helped provide income for the women and raised international awareness of the Maggie Magaba Trust and the Zamani Soweto Sisters Council.

In 1983, Piliso-Seroke worked with American YWCA president Jewel Graham to create the South Africa Study Programme, intended to enable exchanges between American and South African women to learn more about each other's history and engage in meaningful discussions. The South African government denied visas to the American participants, effectively ending the program, but the South African participants were eventually permitted to travel to a World Council of Churches meeting in the United States in 1987, and Piliso-Seroke arranged a screening of one of the documentaries she had produced with Wolpert.

Piliso-Seroke was later detained again, held at the Old Fort Prison on Constitution Hill, Johannesburg. After being released, she became vice president of the World YWCA, a position she held from 1983 to 1995. She worked with other YWCA regions to coordinate campaigns such as the Women Against Oppression Campaign.

=== Post-apartheid ===
Piliso-Seroke served on the Transvaal Board of the National Co-ordinating Council for Returnees between 1992 and 1993, assisting efforts to help South African exiles return home.

In 1996, Piliso-Seroke joined the human rights committee of the South African Truth and Reconciliation Commission (TRC), participating in public hearings that investigated human rights violations and supported victims. She was a trustee for the Eskom Development Foundation. In 1999 she was appointed as the chair of the Commission for Gender Equality and reappointed again in 2002. During her time with the Commission for Gender Equality, Piliso-Seroke found herself tested when the Commission's office was moved to a new location on Constitution Hill – where the women's prison had formerly been situated. Every day, she had to walk past the building where she herself had once been imprisoned. She later spoke about the experience:

Initially, I would always pass and be constantly reminded of what I went through there. I was stripped of my identity; they took everything from me and reduced me to a number... [but] after a while, I would walk through that gate, the same gate I was walked through by apartheid officials, and smile. I would say: "Hi lieutenant, what do you think of me now? I have got my independence, my liberation."

Piliso-Seroke was also chair of the Independent Electoral Commission in 1999.

In 2020, Piliso-Seroke published a memoir entitled Jwara! Induna’s Daughter.

== Honours ==
In 2008, Piliso-Seroke was conferred to South Africa's national Order of the Baobab in Gold, for her contributions to "freedom, development, reconstruction and the struggle for gender equality" in South Africa. In 2014, the Anglican Church of Southern Africa awarded Piliso-Seroke the Order of Simon of Cyrene for her distinguished service.
