= Sarah Calburn =

South African architect

- Born: May 10, 1964 (age 62); Johannesburg, South Africa
- Citizenship: South Africa
- Education: RMIT University (MA)
- Occupation: Architect

Sarah Katherine Calburn (born 10 May 1964) is a South African architect.

== Biography ==
Sarah Calburn was born in Johannesburg where she attended Roedean School, matriculating in 1981. She studied architecture at the University of the Witwatersrand, graduating in 1987, and in 1996 was awarded a master's degree for her research at Australia's Royal Melbourne Institute of Technology. The same year she set up an architecture practice in Johannesburg.

Calburn has also worked as an architect in Paris, Hong Kong, Sydney and Melbourne. In addition to many housing projects, she designed Johannesburg's Momo art gallery. She also serves on the committee of the Gauteng Institute for Architecture and was programme director of ArchitectureZA 2010, the first South African Architectural Biennale. aimed at creative urban development in Johannesburg. Calburn has also taught at the University of the Witwatersrand, the University of Cape Town and RMIT Melbourne.

== Awards ==
In December 2010, together with architect Dustin A. Tusnovics, Sarah Calburn won third prize in the Urbaninform Design Contest in Zurich, Switzerland, for their project Taking the Gap. The jury commented on its strong design, considering it to be a critical initiative for social housing in South Africa.
