= Elsie Vaalbooi =

Speaker of the Nǁng language (c. 1901–2002)

- Born: c. 1901; Rietfontein, Northern Cape
- Died: 7 September 2002
- Occupation: KhoeSan language

Elsie Vaalbooi (c. 1901 – 7 October 2002) was a South African woman who was a member of the ǂKhomani (Nǁnǂe) San or Bushmen and one of the last speakers of the Nǁng language (better known by the name of the primary dialect, Nǀuu). In the 1990s there was concern amongst the ǂKhomani leadership about loss of the Nǁng language: many of those of the community who could speak a KhoeSan language actually spoke Nama. Linguist Anthony Traill interviewed Vaalbooi in 1997, when she was in her late nineties. The South African San Institute became involved in the pursuit of information on the language and, with the help of Vaalbooi, they were able to trace a further ten people who could speak the language.

Elsie Vaalbooi's work on the preservation of the Nǀuu language has been carried forward through a Nǀuu language school, initiated by Katrina Esau (a.k.a. "Ouma Geelmeid"), in Upington.

== Northern Cape motto ==
In 1997 Elsie Vaalbooi assisted linguists and provincial officials in providing a motto for the Northern Cape Province, Sa ǁa !aĩsi 'uĩsi (“We go to a better life”), which is in the Nǀu dialect of the Nǁnǂe (ǂKhomani) people.

== See also ==
- Katrina Esau
- Nǁng language
- San peoples
- ǂKhomani people
- Khoisan languages
