= Braam Jordaan =

South African author and film producer

Braam Jordaan GCOB
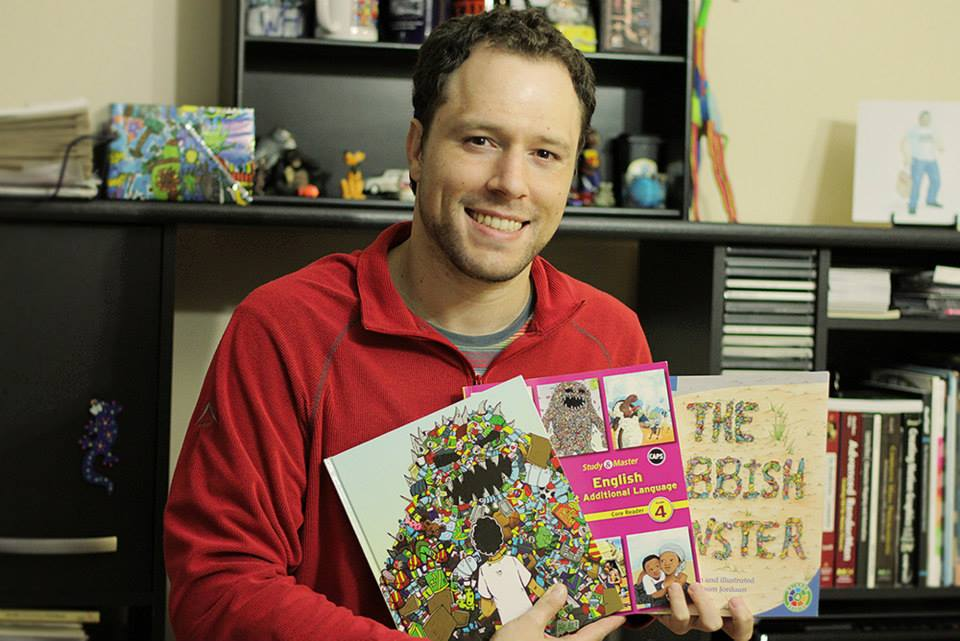
- Born: 1981 (age 44–45); Benoni, Johannesburg, South Africa
- Education: Universal Computer Arts Academy
- Occupations: Entrepreneur, author, filmmaker, animator, advocate, executive
- Employer(s): Convo Global, Ltd. in Vancouver, Canada, Chief Executive Officer
- Organization(s): World Federation of the Deaf, World Federation of the Deaf Youth Section, United Nations, UNICEF Youth Council Member Global Partnership on Children with Disabilities
- Known for: The Rubbish Monster, director, producer, writer, animation (2006)
- Spouse: Drisana Levitzke-Gray (m. 2016)
- Awards: Order of the Baobab (2019), Business in Vancouver Forty under 40 (2020), Henry Viscardi Achievement Awards (2020)
- Website: http://www.braamjordaan.com/

Braam Jordaan (born 1981) is a South African entrepreneur, filmmaker, animator, and activist. He is an advocate for Sign Language and human rights of Deaf people, and a board member of the World Federation of the Deaf Youth Section. In 2009, Jordaan collaborated with the Canadian Cultural Society of the Deaf and Marblemedia on the first children's animated dictionary of American Sign Language, which allows deaf children to look up words in their own primary language of ASL along with the English counterpart. The dictionary allows both deaf children and their hearing parents to learn sign language together.

Jordaan was interviewed by international news organizations including The Washington Times, BBC, and People magazine about the sign language interpreter scandal during the funeral services of President Nelson Mandela.

In 2014, Jordaan collaborated with the Camp Mark Seven's first summer of Deaf Film Camp in making the hit song Happy by Pharrell Williams into an American Sign Language music video. The music video made by all 24 camp students was selected as one of NBC News 25 Most Inspirational Stories of the Year and listed as one of People magazine's 2014 Internet Trends.

In 2019, Jordaan was awarded the Order of the Baobab (Grand Counsellor of the Baobab) in recognition of his efforts in raising awareness of the importance of sign language and the human rights of people from the deaf community around the world through his colourful films and books. The National Orders are the highest awards that South Africans can receive. The president bestows a national order upon a South African citizen or member of the international community who has contributed towards making South Africa a democratic and successful country.

Jordaan was a recipient of Business in Vancouver Forty Under 40 for 2020. The awards recognize the achievements of British Columbia's young entrepreneurs, executives and professionals with demonstrated excellence in business, judgment, leadership and community contribution.

In 2020, Jordaan was awarded Henry Viscardi Achievement Awards for championing better education in the deaf community, on achieving global recognition for his contribution to improving the lives of persons with disabilities.

== Early life and education ==
Jordaan was born in Benoni, South Africa during the era of apartheid to a predominantly deaf family that later moved to Cape Town, South Africa. He attended high school at De La Bat School for the Deaf in Worcester. During high school, Jordaan participated in the Law Commission Workshop at The Bastion in Newlands, Cape Town. At the age of 16, he attended the first-ever Deaf Youth Leadership Camp in Durban, led by Wilma Newhoudt-Druchen, which led to Jordaan being elected to attend the National Youth Policy Commission in Midrand in 1998. In 1998, he became a Member of the Council of Learners, and the chairperson of the council in 2000.

== Career ==
Jordaan's career began at Wicked Pixels, post-production company, creating visual effects and animation for TV commercials, with a client list that included BMW, Rabea Tea, Mitsubishi, Musica, World Wildlife Fund, American Eagle and Yardley.

In 2002, Jordaan won best newcomer and best creative at the Vuka awards by creating a three-dimensional animation advertisement about HIV/AIDS awareness. He also created Sipho the Lion, the official mascot of the XVI World Congress of the World Federation of the Deaf. In 2010, Jordaan created visual effects and animation for an award-winning short film with Gallaudet University called Gallaudet, which had over 140,000 views. Jordaan created a video montage that stretched 1,500 feet at the DeafNation World Expo in 2012. He also won the DeafNation Inspiration Award for Visual Arts that year.

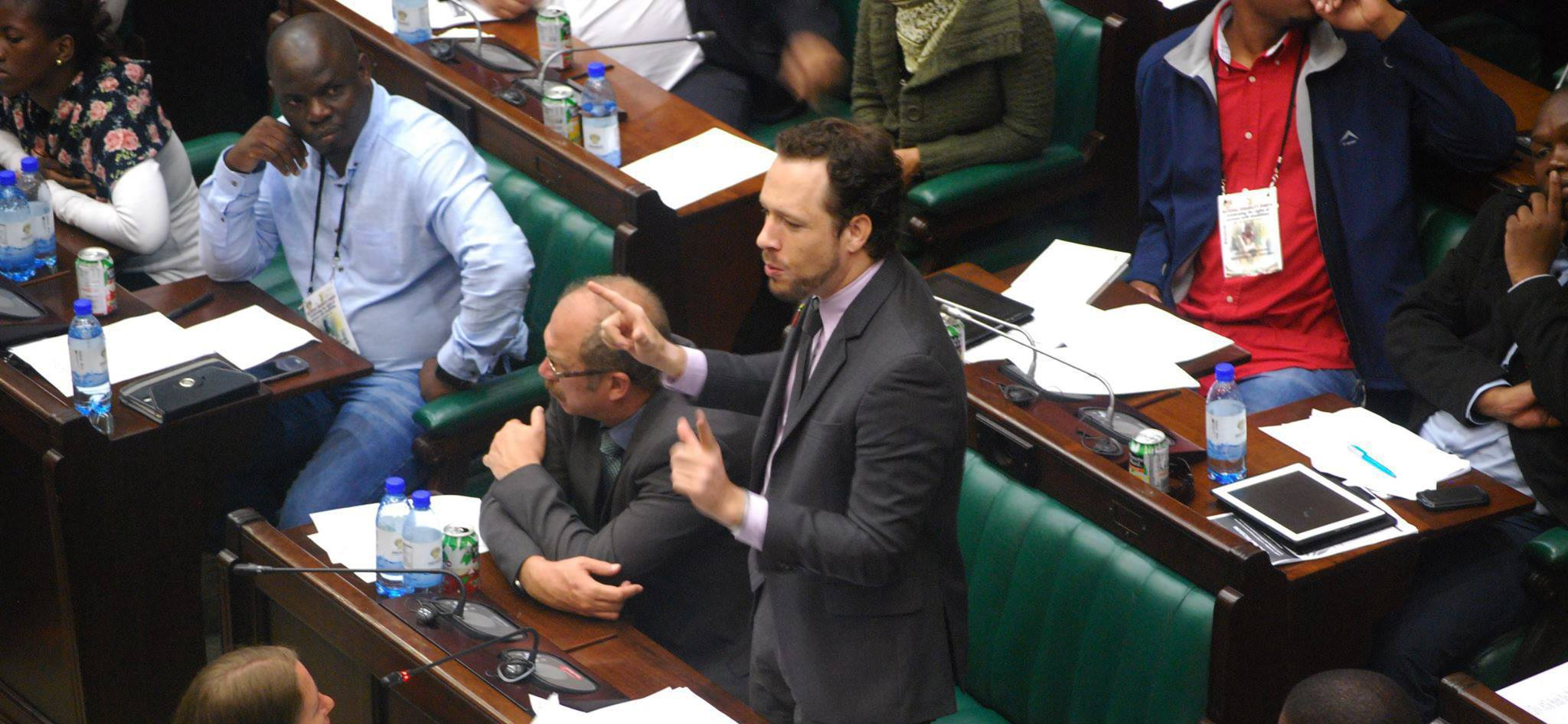
Honorable Member of Disability Rights Parliament

== Deaf education and awareness advocacy ==
Jordaan became a representative of the World Federation of the Deaf, an international organization that represents 70 million deaf people worldwide, and the World Federation of the Deaf Youth Section, a youth section under the World Federation of the Deaf. In 2012, during the Hong Kong International Deaf Film Festival, Jordaan appealed to the Hong Kong government for the development of a proper sign language curriculum and for the accessibility of sign language interpreters in their nation. In 2014, Jordaan delivered a statement about the right to an education in sign language for deaf youth and children to the Youth with Disabilities of the Seventh Conference of States Parties to the Convention on the Rights of Persons with Disabilities. He also works with the United Nations and is a Youth Council Member of the UNICEF Global Partnership on Children with Disabilities.

== #WHccNow campaign ==
Jordaan launched a social media campaign around the hashtag #WHccNow to advocate for the White House to improve accessibility for Deaf and hard of hearing people from the government. Without closed captions on videos from the White House, Deaf and hard of hearing people are excluded. The hashtag stands for 'White House closed caption now,' and it trended on Twitter's accessibility advocate communities. The White House responded with a State of the Union preview video with open captions posted on social media and the State Department Special Advisor for International Disability Rights, Judith Heumann announced that the White House opened Accessibility Officer position to lead inclusion efforts.

== Launch of South Africa's First National Relay Service ==
After seven years of advocacy, Braam Jordaan, co-founder of Convo Global, spearheaded the establishment of South Africa's first National Relay Service through Convo South Africa and MTN Group in 2022. This pioneering service, part of a broader commitment to ensure equal access to telecommunications for everyone in South Africa, including those with hearing and/or speech disabilities, reflects a nation-wide effort, endorsed by Independent Communications Authority of South Africa and supported by President Cyril Ramaphosa, towards a more inclusive society.

The concept for this service was conceived seven years prior by Jordaan, who began advocating for it after experiencing similar services abroad and discussing telecommunication access with President Cyril Ramaphosa upon receiving the Order of the Baobab Award in 2019. Subsequently, in 2021, ICASA amended the Code on People with Disabilities, mandating that electronic communication service licensees provide a National Relay Service (NRS).
