= Mira Fassler Kamstra =

- Born: Mira Fassler; 1938 (age 87–88)
- Education: University of the Witwatersrand
- Occupation: Architect
- Spouse: Michael Kamstra (m. 1961; div. 1975)
- Children: Three
- Father: John Fassler
- Awards: SAIA Gold Medal for Architecture

Mira Fassler Kamstra (born 1938) has been called the "grande dame" of architecture for her prominent and sustained contributions to South African architecture. Kamstra has had 50 years of experience in the field and was actively involved in the Transvaal Institute of Architects (now the Gauteng Institute for Architecture), serving as president from 1993-1996.

The five decades of work includes residential, civic, educational, and heritage restoration projects, particularly in Johannesburg and Gauteng. In 2017, she received the South African Institute of Architects (SAIA) Gold Medal for Architecture in recognition of her lifetime contribution to the profession.

Born of parents who were 1820 settlers / Swiss heritage, Kamstra is the daughter of architect John Fassler, who served as Professor and later Head of Architecture at the University of the Witwatersrand. After her father’s death in 1971, she inherited his practice and completed ongoing projects, including work associated with the University of the Witwatersrand campus. During the 1970s she established an independent practice and later formed the partnership with architect Marcus Holmes in 1978.

This practice became known for contextual modernist architecture and heritage-sensitive design. Kamstra’s architectural work often emphasized climate responsiveness, regional identity, landscape integration, and adaptation of vernacular forms. She developed a reputation for conservation architecture and adaptive reuse projects, including restoration work on Johannesburg City Hall, later converted into the Gauteng Legislature.

== Notable works ==
Kamstra’s other notable projects are the SAHETI schools 1970s. The school campus design departed from conventional institutional layouts by emphasizing communal interaction and interconnected learning spaces. The project received professional recognition and architectural awards. She also designed House de la Harpe in Morningside, Johannesburg, a residence noted for its reinterpretation of Karoo and Victorian farmhouse traditions. The house received a SAIA Award of Merit in 1979.
