= Malethola Maggie Nkwe =

Malethola Maggie Nkwe (born 1938) is an Anglican community service activist.

== Personal life ==
Malethola Maggie Nkwe was born in March 1938 in Turffontein, Johannesburg. Her family moved to a one-roomed house in Soweto in 1947, at a time when black residence in the urban areas was still a contentious issue. She started school at the Salvation Army Church School in 1948 where she excelled. In the early 1960s she qualified as a nurse, a career that introduced her to the daily social realities of life in the townships.

== Community service ==
Her preoccupation with the quality of life for black people in the townships moved her to be one of the pioneers of primary healthcare in the volatile, post-1976 period when suspicions were rampant. Shortly after her husband, David, was made deacon of the Anglican Church in the Anglican Diocese of Johannesburg in 1962, Nkwe was admitted into the Mothers Union of the same diocese.

Through the influence of the church, she dedicated her life to strive for the improvement of women’s lives, even when her husband was transferred to Klerksdorp. In 1974, she was elected the first black president of the Mother’s Union. Her life became a commitment to selfless community service, embracing mainly the marginalised groups in society, namely, abandoned children, women and widows. After the 1976 unrest, Nkwe resigned from her nursing work to spearhead the drive to save the Orlando Children’s Home, which was a sanctuary for abandoned black children. Through her tireless initiatives, the Orlando Children’s Home was renovated. She cared for the children and focused on giving them the kind of life of which they were deprived. In 1990, Nkwe and her husband moved to Matlosane where she established a Women’s Desk, whose aim was to foster self-worth and restore the dignity of marginalised and abused women, and also to start sustainable self-help programmes. She is a founder and national chairperson of the Widows' Forum, which is essentially a platform for self-help among widows. She promoted and led campaigns against the abuse of women, and also mobilised help for victims of natural disasters. Her other initiatives include pre-schools, after-school care centres, literacy programmes, a drop-in centre for individual and family disputes, workshops and training programmes on HIV and AIDS and sex education and sexuality for the youth and adults, moral enrichment and poverty alleviation.

Nkwe is also a founder of Khulumani, a post-Truth and Reconciliation Commission victim-support group in Klerksdorp and the Sedibeng sa Tshepo drop-in centre in the Diocese of Matlosane. She has established a professional community forum, an organisation of concerned principals, community and other professionals who deal with orphans and destitute children in schools around the Kosh (Klerksdorp, Orkney, Stilfontein and Hartebeesfontein) area.

== Awards ==
- In 2002 she was awarded the Order of Simon of Cyrene by the Anglican Church of Southern Africa
- On 27 March 2009 she was awarded the Order of the Baobab in bronze for her devotion to the community through serving those less fortunate.
