= Andrew Ross (medical doctor) =

Andrew John Ross is a family medicine specialist at UKZN, and is the founder and a trustee of Umthombo Youth Development Foundation (UYDF) which has produced more than 135 graduates in 16 different health science disciplines.

== Early life ==
Ross was born in South Africa to Christian parents who were both medical doctors working as missionaries in South Africa, Nigeria and Ethiopia. He grew up in these countries and went to boarding school in the UK before returning home to South Africa. As a result of his childhood in several African countries and his boarding school experience, he acquired a strong appreciation of cultural differences and developed his ability to empathize with others. Upon returning to South Africa, his father became a professor at the University of KwaZulu-Natal, which at the time had a good quality faculty of medicine that would train black students.

== Medical work ==
After various public hospital postings as a junior doctor until 1990, Ross worked as the senior medical officer at the Mosvold Hospital in rural Kwa-Zulu Natal.

He is presently the Principal Specialist in Family Medicine at the medical school at UKZN.

== Awards ==
Ross was listed as a Lead South African Hero for his role in nurturing youngsters from rural KwaZulu-Natal into professional health scientists. In 2014, Ross was elected as a fellow of the Ashoka Fellowship. On 27 April 2015, Ross was awarded the Order of the Baobab in the silver class.

== Publications ==
- Kendon, M; Knight, S E; Ross, A; Giddy, J (January 2012). "S - Timing of antiretroviral therapy initiation in adults with HIV-associated tuberculosis: Outcomes of therapy in an urban hospital in KwaZulu-Natal". South African Medical Journal. 102 (12): 931–5. doi:10.7196/samj.5574 (inactive 11 July 2025). PMID 23498040.
- Ross, A; Reid, S (May 2009). "The retention of community service officers for an additional year at district hospitals in KwaZulu-Natal and the Eastern Cape and Limpopo provinces : original research". South African Family Practice. 51 (3). doi:10.1080/20786204.2009.10873856. hdl:10520/EJC80372.
- Ross, Andrew; Mash, Bob (2014). "African primary care research: Reviewing the literature". African Journal of Primary Health Care & Family Medicine. 6 (1): E1-4. doi:10.4102/phcfm.v6i1.584. ISSN 2071-2936. PMC 4502874. PMID 26245433.
- Igbojiaku, Okoroma J.; Harbor, Ogbonnaya C.; Ross, Andrew (2013). "Compliance with diabetes guidelines at a regional hospital in KwaZulu-Natal, South Africa". African Journal of Primary Health Care & Family Medicine. 5 (1): 447. doi:10.4102/phcfm.v5i1.447. ISSN 2071-2936. PMC 4565451.
- Khan, Feroza Y.; Ross, Andrew J. (2013). "Hepatitis B Immunisation amongst doctors and laboratory personnel in KwaZulu-Natal, South Africa". African Journal of Primary Health Care & Family Medicine. 5 (1): 452. doi:10.4102/phcfm.v5i1.452. ISSN 2071-2936. PMC 4565422.
- Oni, Ezekiel E.; Ross, Andrew; Van der Linde, Stephan (2013). "Contraceptive practices amongst HIV-positive women on antiretroviral therapy attending an ART clinic in South Africa". African Journal of Primary Health Care & Family Medicine. 5 (1): 461. doi:10.4102/phcfm.v5i1.461. ISSN 2071-2936. PMC 4709495.

== Notes and references ==
- "UKZN's Family Medicine Specialist is one of South Africa's finest citizens". ukzn.ac.za. 29 October 2013.
