= Order of Ethiopia =

African Methodist order

The Order of Ethiopia (iBandla lamaTopiya) was an African religious group from the Methodist Church which originated from the Ethiopian movement started by 19th century African theologians such as Tiyo Soga, Nehemiah Tile, Pambani Mzimba, Mangena Mokoena, James Mata Dwane and others. After trying to associate themselves with the African Methodist Episcopal Church (A.M.E.) in search of establishing an authentic African Church, they ended up forming relations with the Anglican Church of the Province of Southern Africa, It was founded and initially led by James Mata Dwane. Dwane left the A.M.E church as he did not feel his episcopal status was valid, and thus along with the likes of M. Mpumlwane and Nehemiya Tile left the church. They sought talks with the Church of the Province and in 1900 a compact was signed by the seven bishops of the province to be in communion with the Ethiopian Church. This involved a decision to consecrate bishops, priest and deacons for the Order. Dwane was made a deacon in 1900, ordained as a priest in 1911 and he died in 1916 as the Provincial superior of the order a presidential title equal to that of an Anglican bishop.

== End of the order ==
In July 1999, the provincial synod of the Church of the Province of Southern Africa was petitioned by Bishop Sigqibo Dwane, the first bishop of the order, to rescind its Canon 48, which dealt with the relations between the CPSA and the Order of Ethiopia. The order then decided, on 27 August 1999, to change its name to the Ethiopian Episcopal Church, and declared that the Ethiopian Episcopal Church was the successor in title to the Ibandla laseTiyopia / Order of Ethiopia.

== Bibliography ==
- Dwane, Sigqibo (1999). Ethiopianism and the Ethiopian Episcopal Church. Glosderry: Ethiopian Episcopal Church. ISBN 0-620-24969-2.
- Verryn, Trevor D. (1972). A history of the Order of Ethiopia. Pretoria: Ecumenical Research Unit.
