= Dawid Kruiper =

South African politician and actor

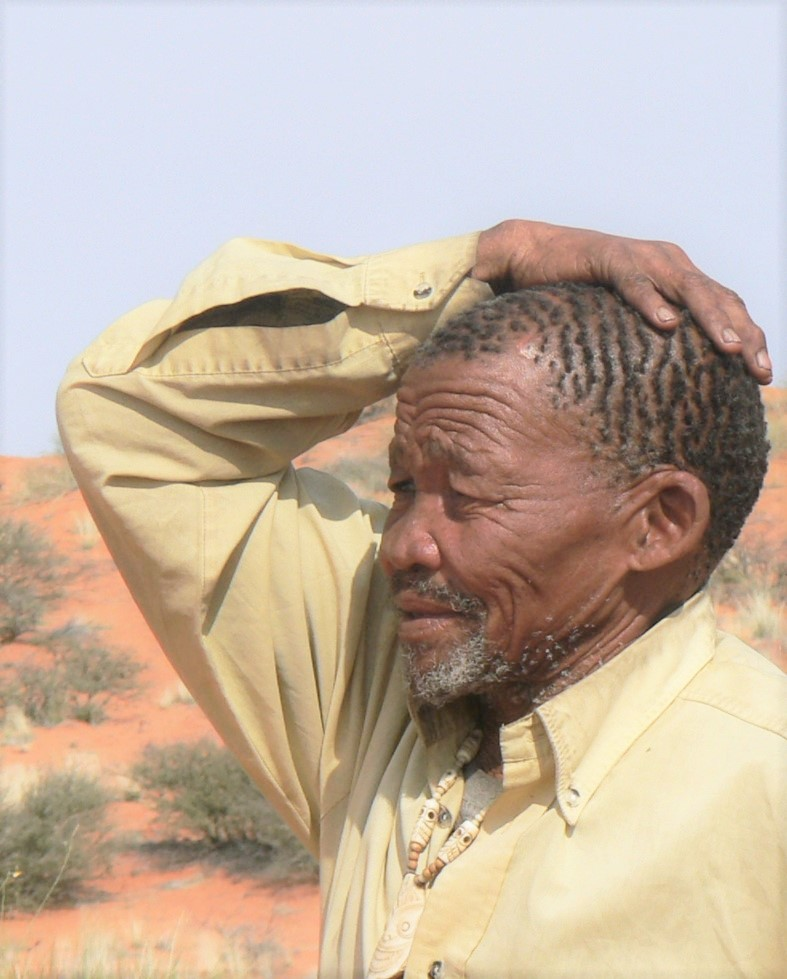
- Dawid Kruiper in the Kgalgadi National Park, 29 July 2009
- Born: 1 September 1935; Around Kalahari Desert, Cape Province, Union of South Africa
- Died: 13 June 2012 (aged 76); Upington, Northern Cape, South Africa
- Occupation: Traditional healer
- Known for: ǂKhomani activism

Dawid Kruiper GCOB (1 September 1935 – 13 June 2012) was a Khoekhoe-speaking traditional healer and leader of the ǂKhomani people in the Kalahari.

Well known for his acting role in The Gods Must Be Crazy II, Kruiper spoke for the rights of indigenous people to the United Nations in 1994, and led the way for successful land-claims for the San people in South Africa, culminating in the restoration of 40,000 hectares of land in 1999.

He also made headlines after hitch-hiking from the Kalahari to Cape Town in 2004 to speak to then South African president Thabo Mbeki, and was also involved in the development and restoration of the San languages.

Kruiper was born in the Kalahari National Park. He was outspoken on the theft of traditional knowledge, particularly regarding hoodia, by western pharmaceutical companies.

Kruiper died at approximately noon on June 13, 2012 at Upington Medi-Clinic in Upington. He had been transferred there from Gordonia Regional Hospital on June 12, 2012 after his condition abruptly deteriorated.

== Legacy ==
Cape Town has the Dawid Kruiper Bridge that crosses over Nelson Mandela Boulevard.

== See also ==
- Dawid Kruiper Local Municipality
