= Shigalo =

- Location within Limpopo Location within South Africa
- Coordinates: 22°56′1″S 30°42′53″E
- Country: South Africa
- Province: Limpopo
- District: Vhembe
- Municipality: Thulamela

Area
  - Total: 6.80 km^{2} (2.63 sq mi)

Population (2011)
  - Total: 7,670
  - Density: 1,130/km^{2} (2,920/sq mi)

Racial makeup (2011)
  - Black African: 99.8%
  - Coloured: 0.1%
  - White: 0.1%

First languages (2011)
  - Tsonga: 98.3%
  - Other: 1.7%
- Time zone: UTC+2 (SAST)

Shigalo is a small town on the R81 route, falling under the Thulamela Local Municipality in the Limpopo province of South Africa.

Shigalo is famed for being the birthplace of the South African potter and sculptor Noria Muelwa Mabasa.
