= Barry Smith (organist) =

South African organist

Barry Smith (born 13 May 1939) is a South African organist, choral and orchestral conductor, author, and musicologist.

== Early life, education, and career ==
Born in Port Elizabeth in South Africa, Smith was a chorister at St Mary's Collegiate Church, Port Elizabeth. Educated at the Grey School in Port Elizabeth (1946–1955), in 1956 Smith was awarded a scholarship to Rhodes University, where he completed his PhD degree. In 1960, Smith went to the United Kingdom on scholarship to the Royal School of Church Music. Smith then returned to South Africa to serve as Director of Music for two years at the Michaelhouse senior school for boys in KwaZulu-Natal province from 1962 to 1964. He was appointed as Organist and Master of the Choristers at St George's Cathedral, Cape Town in 1964 – the first South African to hold this position, in which he continued for 42 years.

== Work ==
From 1966 to 1999, Smith was an Associate Professor on the staff of the Faculty of Music at the University of Cape Town, and during his time there, he completed a PhD at Rhodes University on the subject of Peter Warlock. Later, he was also awarded a DMus from the University of Cape Town in 1996. In 1964, Smith founded the St. George's Singers, which he directed until 2015. Besides conducting in the United Kingdom, Austria, and Israel, Smith has made several solo recital tours both in America, England and Australia and played in Westminster Abbey and King's College, Cambridge.

He has adjudicated in Hong Kong and directed music courses in Perth, Australia and in Washington D.C. In June 2007, Smith and his St George's Singers took part in the Sir Edward Elgar 150th Anniversary Celebrations in Worcester, England, where he also conducted the Royal Liverpool Philharmonic Orchestra in Worcester Cathedral. In 2013, he conducted the English Symphony Orchestra at the Bromsgrove Music Festival. Smith was the choirmaster and organist at St Michael's Catholic Church. in Rondebosch, Cape Town from 2007 until 2014. He now plays for the Sunday morning service at the Gardens Presbyterian Church in Cape Town.

== Honours and awards ==
In 1989 Archbishop Desmond Tutu awarded Smith with the Order of Simon of Cyrene, the highest honour the Anglican Church of Southern Africa can bestow on a layman.

Smith has received honorary fellowships from the Guild of Church Musicians in the United Kingdom in 1989, the Royal School of Church Music in 1994, and the Academy of St Cecilia in 2008. He is an honorary associate of the Centre for the History of Music in Britain, the Empire and the Commonwealth at the University of Bristol.

In 2009 the Cape Tercentenary Foundation awarded him the Gold Molteno Medal for lifetime achievement in the performing arts.

Smith received the Parnassus award from the Stellenbosch University music department in 2010, and in 2011 a mayor's medal from Cape Town mayor Dan Plato.

In May 2013 he was appointed President of the Peter Warlock Society.

== Publications ==
- Peter Warlock: The Life of Philip Heseltine. Oxford University Press. 1996. ISBN 978-0-19-816606-1.
- Barry Smith, ed. (2000). Frederick Delius and Peter Warlock: A Friendship Revealed. Oxford University Press. ISBN 978-0-19-816706-8.
- Occasional Writings of Philip Heseltine (Peter Warlock): Miscellaneous Writings. Vol. 1 to Vol. 4. Thames Publishing. 1999. ISBN 978-0-903413-49-7.
- Warlock, Peter (2005). Barry Smith (ed.). The Collected Letters of Peter Warlock. Boydell. ISBN 978-1-84383-080-1. 4 volumes.
- Kaikhosru Sorabji's Letters to Philip Heseltine (Peter Warlock) edited by Brian Inglis and Barry Smith (Routledge, 2020).

== Notes and references ==
- Chivers, Chris (18 April 2004). "Barry Smith and the music of freedom". The Cathedral Church of St George the Martyr. Archived from the original on 20 August 2008.
- Smith, Barry. "The Hill Organ in St George's Cathedral, Cape Town". The Cathedral Church of St George the Martyr. Archived from the original on 20 August 2008.
