= Nadia Tromp =

South African architect (born 1977)

- Born: 31 January 1977 (age 49); Fishhoek, South Africa
- Education: University of Cape Town; Harvard University
- Occupation: Architect
- Awards: World Architecture Festival (Health) (2017)
- Buildings: Westbury Transformation Development Centre, Hillbrow Esselen Street Clinic, Westbury Clinic,
- Website: www.ntsika.co.za

Nadia Tromp (born 31 January 1977) is a South African architect, known for her work with social and public architecture, particularly healthcare within the context of South Africa. In 2017 she was the world architecture festival winner in the category of health for her Westbury clinic. She later received the 2017 award of excellence from GIFA (Gauteng Institute for Architecture) and the 2018 award of merit from SAIA (South African Institute of Architects). In 2019 her firm won the architecture Masterprize in the category of mixed use.

== Early life and education ==
Tromp was born in Fishhoek, South Africa. She studied her undergraduate degree at the University of Cape Town, and then her Bachelor of Architecture degree at University of Cape Town, graduating in 2000. After graduating and working at Noero Wolff architects under Jo Noero, she went on to become a director at Paragon Habitat Architects. In 2008 she founded her firm "Ntsika Architects", meaning pillar of strength or home pillar. She spent a year at Harvard University as a Nieman Affiliate 2012-2013, with her husband, Beauregard Tromp, receiving the Nieman Fellowship for journalism.

== Design approach ==
Tromp prioritizes architecture that has social impact. Her work on clinics in South Africa, in collaboration with the government and work in the civic sphere has led to her specialization in the field. Tromp has spoken at the AZA festival in Pretoria and has been a judge for the PPC Imaginarium Award for Architecture.

== Union Internationale des Architectes (UIA) ==
Tromp holds the position of Director of the International Union of Architects (UIA) "Community Architecture" - Architecture & Human Rights, Work programme, a global ongoing workshop that runs parallel to the preparation for each UIA Congress, this workshop is to be completed in time for the 2020 Brazil UIA Congress.

== GIFA (Gauteng Institute for Architecture) ==
In February 2018 Tromp was elected President of the Gauteng Institute for Architecture, her term ended in February 2020 when the next president for GIfA, Krynauw Nel was elected.

== Selected work ==
=== Hillbrow Esselen Street Clinic ===
Year: 2014/15

Location: South Africa, Hillbrow

=== Westbury Clinic ===
Year: 2014/15

Location: South Africa, Westbury

=== Westbury Transformation Development Centre ===
Year: 2015/16 - 2019

Location: South Africa, Westbury

== Upcoming projects ==
=== Rea Vaya BRT Stations & Urban upgrades ===
Year: 2019 - 2022

Location: South Africa, Sandton & Gandhi Square

== Awards and recognitions ==
- 2015 - 19millionproject winner – MoHM (Museum of Human Migration) Mobile Modular Museum, Rome
- 2015 - Mbokodo South African Women in the Arts
- 2017 - Women in Construction Awards – Architecture - finalist
- 2017 - Award of merit for Westbury Clinic Project - GIFA
- 2017 - Completed Buildings Category Winner for Westbury Clinic Project - World Architecture Festival, Berlin
- 2018 - SAIA- Corobrik Merit Award: Westbury Clinic Project
- 2018 - President of Gauteng Institute for Architects (GIFA)
- 2018 - Director of the International Union of Architects (UIA)
- 2023 - 34th Sophia Gray Memorial Lecture Laureate

"Community Architecture" - Architecture & Human Rights, Work Programme
