= Roedean School (South Africa) =

Roedean School (SA)

Location
- Princess of Wales Terrace; Johannesburg, Gauteng; South Africa

Information
- School type: Private & Boarding
- Motto: Honneur Aulx Dinges (Honour to the Worthy)
- Religious affiliation: Christianity
- Established: 1903; 123 years ago
- Founder: Theresa Lawrence and Katherine Margaret Earle
- Sister school: Roedean School
- School number: 011 647 3200
- Chairperson: Nicky Fitzgerald
- Rector: Roger Cameron
- Head of Junior School: Keshma Patel
- Executive Director: Former: Mrs Lindi Dlamini
- Primary years taught: Grade 0 - Upper IU (UIV)
- Gender: Female
- Age: 5 to 18
- Enrollment: 750 girls
- Language: English
- Schedule: 07:30 - 15:00
- Campus: Urban Campus
- Campus type: Suburban
- Houses: Bears, Kats and Lambs
- Colours: Blue; Green; White
- Nickname: Roedeanian
- School fees: Upper V (Grade 10), Ante Matric (Grade 11), Matric (Grade 12) R218 877 Lower V (Grade 8), Middle V (Grade 9) R198 850 Form II (Grade 4) to Upper IV (Grade 7) R176 791 Form I (Grade 3) R157 468 Grade I and Grade II R134 198 Grade 0 R114 214
- Feeder schools: Auckland Park Preparatory School Bluebird Pre-Primary School Riviera Nursery School St John's Bridge Nursery School St Katherine's School
- Affiliation: Roud Square ISASA
- Exam board: IEB
- Alumnae: Old Roedeanians
- Website: www.roedeanschool.co.za

Roedean School for Girls is a private English medium and boarding school for girls situated in the suburb of Parktown in the city of Johannesburg in the Gauteng province of South Africa.

== History ==
The school was founded in 1903 by Theresa Lawrence and, Katherine Margaret Earle: two young women in their early thirties, both educated at the University of Cambridge. They acted as joint Heads of School during the years 1903–1930. It is a sister school of Roedean School in Brighton, England which was founded by three older sisters of Theresa Lawrence, namely Penelope, Millicent, and Dorothy.

The school began with 22 pupils, and was situated in a small house in Jeppestown, Johannesburg. In 1904, it relocated to its current site in Parktown, Johannesburg.

Sir Herbert Baker, a prominent architect responsible for many of Johannesburg's most historical houses and monuments, designed the original school buildings. The oldest structures include St. Ursula's Building and Founder's Hall. Over the years, additions have been made, but the signature Herbert Baker features, with arches, colonnades, unwashed brickwork, and courtyards have been maintained.

== Notable alumnae ==
- Mary Maytham Kidd, botanical artist
- Sheena Duncan, social activist
- Jani Allan
- Camilla Waldman, actress
- Maud Sumner, artist
- Lauren Beukes, author
- Jillian Becker, writer
- Sarah Calburn, architect
- Kate Otten, architect
- Rapelang Rabana, entrepreneur
- Barbara Creecy, politician and former anti-apartheid activist

== Academics ==
Roedean's leavers write the Independent Examinations Board exams.

Roedean School

== Sport ==
The sports that are offered in the school are:

- Diving
- Equestrian
- Hockey
- Netball
- Rock climbing
- Soccer
- Squash
- Strength and conditioning
- Swimming
- Water polo

== See also ==
- List of boarding schools
