= Rapelang Rabana =

South African computer scientist and entrepreneur

- Born: November 5, 1983 (age 42); Gaborone, Botswana
- Education: University of Cape Town (BS, MS)
- Occupations: Computer Scientist; Entrepreneur; Businesswoman
- Employer: Imagine Worldwide

Rapelang Rabana (/rɑːpɛlɑŋ ræbɑnɑ/, tsn) (born November 5, 1983) is a computer scientist, entrepreneur, and a keynote speaker. She is currently the Co-CEO of Imagine Worldwide, an education technology NGO providing literacy and numeracy across multiple countries in Sub-Saharan Africa. Prior to joining Imagine Worldwide, Rapelang was Founder and CEO of Rekindle Learning, a learning technology company; and previously co-founded Yeigo Communications, South Africa's first free VoIP mobile services provider.

She has been featured on the cover of ForbesAfrica magazine, selected as a FastCompany Maverick, named Entrepreneur for the World by the World Entrepreneurship Forum and selected as a Young Global Leader by the World Economic Forum.

== Early life and education ==
Rabana was born in Gaborone, Botswana. She started her schooling in Gaborone at Thornhill Primary School before moving to Johannesburg and attended Roedean School. Rapelang graduated with honours from the University of Cape Town in 2005 with a bachelor's degree in Business Science with a specialty in Computer Science, and later obtained a Masters of Science degree from the same institution. Rapelang returned to the University of Cape Town to give a commencement speech in 2019.

== Career ==
After graduating from university, Rapelang, along with her fellow university classmates, created the pioneering mobile VoIP application called Yeigo in 2006, winning the inaugural Enablis Business Plan competition. In 2009, Telfree, a South African next-generation operator, bought a majority stake in Yeigo. Rabana was appointed as the leader of Telfree's Research and Development department until she exited the business in 2012.

In 2013, Rapelang founded Rekindle Learning, which empowers people to respond to the changing world of work through digital learning experiences. In her TEDxCapeTown talk Using mobiles to rekindle learning, she shares the inspiration behind Rekindle Learning. McKinsey recognized Rekindle Learning as a ‘striking innovation in mobile learning’ in the report, Lions go digital: the internet’s transformative power in Africa (2013). In November 2017, Rapelang was named Chief Digital Officer of BCX, one of South Africa's largest ICT companies, where she served until the end of 2018. Rapelang's continued her pursuits in driving innovation as a founding member and mentor of the Norrsken Impact Impact Accelerator

In 2023, Rapelang was named Co-CEO of Imagine Worldwide. Imagine Worldwide is a recipient of the 2024 Klaus J. Jacobs Best Practice Prize, which recognizes institutions and individuals who are working to implement evidence-based solutions aimed at promoting child development and learning in practice. Under her leadership, Imagine has grown to serve 700,000 children by early 2025, with plans to expand the tablet-learning program nationwide in Malawi, and replicate the model in countries like Sierra Leone and Tanzania.

Rapelang serves on the board of the listed subsidiary, Standard Chartered Bank Botswana, and has previously served as a non-executive director of African Leadership Academy (Mauritius), Project Literacy, New York (USA), and Nisela Capital (South Africa).

== Achievements ==
Rapelang is considered to be a leading African technology entrepreneur. In 2019, the President of the Republic of South Africa, His Excellency Cyril Ramaphosa, stated “The problem with us as South Africans is that we always put ourselves down. We always think that we are not as good as we are. And sometimes we even think that we don’t have people who are at the cutting edge of knowledge. But we have them here. And Rapelang Rabana is one of those.” Early in her career, Rapelang was selected as an Endeavor ‘high-impact’ entrepreneur and as an Ambassador & Juror of the World Summit Awards In 2011, Rapelang was selected to be part of the Global Shapers Community of young leaders below 30, of the World Economic Forum. She was invited to the Annual Meeting in Davos in 2012 where she spoke in the closing plenary, The Future Across Generations, alongside Muhammad Yunus and Klaus Schwab.

In 2012, she was listed on Oprah Magazine's O Power List. In 2013, she was listed on Forbes's 30 under 30 list for best entrepreneurs of Africa and appeared on the cover of the ForbesAfrica August 2013 issue. In 2014, Rapelang was named one of the Entrepreneurs of the World by the World Entrepreneurship Forum and invited to join the Harambe Entrepreneur Alliance. In 2017, Rapelang was selected as a Young Global Leader of the World Economic Forum.

== Thought Leadership ==
Rapelang has shared her ideas on innovation, technology, entrepreneurship, and education, from an African perspective, on many platforms. She has authored the articles: Could young people be the immune system of the world? (2012); 5 ways universal internet access could transform Africa (2016); How Africa's entrepreneurs are changing the direction of globalization (2019); How to give start-ups a head-start (2019). She has also contributed chapters in the books The Other End of the Telescope by Ian Russell, and the collection, The Book Every Business Owner Must Read: It's Time for Different.

Rapelang gave the keynote address at the Gartner Symposium 2015 in Cape Town,. In 2016, she interviewed His Excellency President Paul Kagame of Rwanda at the World Economic Forum on Africa. As a business leader, Rapelang also presented at Accenture Innovation Conference (2017), the IMF Annual Meeting in Washington DC (2017), the BCXDisrupt Summit (2017) where she also shared a panel with Malcolm Gladwell and musician will.i.am, the Malta Innovation Summit (2019).
