= Katrina Esau =

South African language preservationist

- ǂXuu, Nǀaukusi
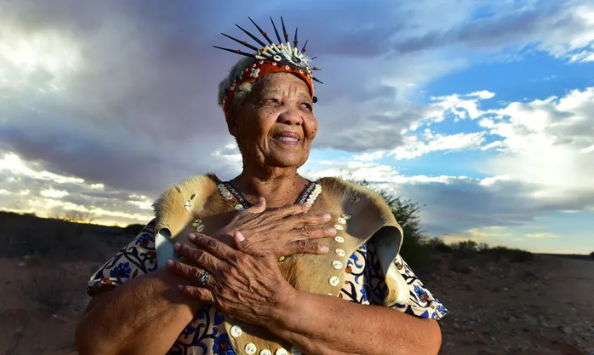
- Born: 1933 (age 92–93) near Olifantshoek, Cape Province, Union of South Africa
- Other names: Ouma Geelmeid, Ouma Katrina, Queen Katrina, Katrina Vaalbooi
- Occupations: Owner of a school, teacher of Nǁng language, activist
- Known for: Last living speaker of Nǀuu or Nǁng language
- Relatives: Claudia Snyman, granddaughter
- Awards: Order of the Baobab in silver, 2025
- Honours: Honorary Doctorate in literature from University of Cape Town, 2023

Ouma Katrina Esau (born 1933), popularly known as Ouma Katrina or Queen Katrina, is a South African teacher and language activist, born near Olifantshoek, Cape Province (now Northern Cape) and now residing in Rosedale, near Upington. She is considered the last living native speaker of Nǀuu, the ancestral indigenous language of the ǂKhomani San people and a branch of Tuu languages. She leads a school where she teaches children her language. She was awarded the Order of the Baobab in 2014 in recognition of her efforts to preserve her language.

== Biography ==
Katrina Esau was born in 1933 on a farm near Olifantshoek, Union of South Africa, some 150km from the border to what is now Botswana. Her father, who was of mixed Tswana-Nǀuu heritage, herded sheep for a white, Afrikaans-speaking family; her mother worked as a domestic. She was given the name Nǀaukusi, which means 'I have seen him coming', but because of her yellow complexion, her parents' employer decided to change her name to Geelmeid (yellow maid servant). She has shared that, as a child, she, her brother and her two older sisters only spoke Nǀuu, not only at home but also with their neighbours. However, the farm owner had labelled Nǀuu an "ugly language" which he did not tolerate on his farm; his prejudice against San people went so far that when the children visited their mother on the farm, they had to sit under the table. So Katrina's mother taught them Afrikaans and her father advised them never to speak their language while in earshot of white people, as the farm owner might kill them, a fear that has its roots in the trauma of San people who have experienced systematic prejudice, acculturation and genocide.

When she was 17, Katrina and her family relocated to Upington to make a new life. At that stage, they stopped using Nǀuu and integrated into the Afrikaans-speaking Coloured community, which pained Esau. As a young adult, she went on to live a life typical of women of San heritage in the Northern Cape, "looking after sheep and cleaning kitchens on her hands and knees".

During the 1990s, while the Nǀuu language was thought to be extinct, it became known that there was still a group of approximately 20 people who were still fluent in it, all aged 60 and older, among them Esau and her siblings. Linguists, among them Namibian academic Prof. Levi Namaseb, undertook research, interviewing those remaining speakers, organising workshops, and encouraged them to teach the language to younger generations, something that they felt unable to at first. Over time, Katrina Esau started to take steps towards teaching it, building on the work of Elsie Vaalbooi.

In 2002, with the support of her granddaughter Claudia Snyman, she set up a school in a wooden hut outside her home in Rosedale, on the outskirts of Upington. In December 2013, the school burnt down, destroying all the books and materials they needed. A donation of books from the University of Cape Town enabled them to start over again.

In 2014, she was awarded the Order of the Baobab in the category Silver for "her excellent contribution to the preservation of a language that is facing a threat of extinction. Her determination to make the project successful has inspired young generations to learn."

In 2023, Esau, who never attended school, was awarded an Honorary Doctorate from the University of Cape Town in recognition for her efforts to the preservation of the Nǀuu language and oral literature.

Despite all these successes, Esau struggled to keep her school afloat and had no means to pay salaries or even a stipend. In September 2025, Acting President Paul Mashatile indicated that Gayton McKenzie, Minister of Sport, Arts, and Culture, would support her school.

== Teaching Nǀuu and developing educational materials ==
Esau has been supported by community members and specifically by her granddaughter Claudia Snyman in running the school. She has learners aged three to nineteen.

Teaching a language as complex as Nǀuu, with its 45 click sounds and 30 non-click consonants in addition to 39 vowels, requires determination as well as quality educational resources. Grandmother and granddaughter have developed teaching resources such as a children's book, !Qhoi nǀa Tjhoi (Tortoise and Ostrich), published in 2021, CDs and DVDs and more recently the Saasi Epsi learning app. They have also collaborated with a team of linguists from the University of Cape Town's Centre for African Language Diversity (CALDi), to produce a trilingual Nǀuu-Afrikaans-English reader/dictionary entitled Ouma Geelmeid ke kx’u ǁxaǁxa Nǀuu, Ouma Geelmeid teaches Nǀuu. In addition to everyday phrases and sentences from twelve thematic areas, the reader contains prayers, songs and games, with colour illustrations, as well as glossaries.

== Books, shows and films inspired by Katrina Esau ==
=== Films ===
- Lost Tongue (2016), a documentary film written and directed by Davison Mudzingwa, Mvura Ya Afrika (MYA) Productions.
- Language of my soul, 2024, a documentary film directed by Gregory Molale

=== Books ===
- Golden Girl: The Story of Katrina Esau (2024) by Lorato Trok and Wendy Hartmann, illustrated by Elizabeth Pulles (children's book), ISBN 978-1-4314-3497-8

=== Stage productions ===
- Katrina, the dancing language, 2018, with music by Coenie de Villiers and choreography by Kirvan Fortuin

== See also ==
- Khoisan languages
- Nǁng language, commonly referred to as Nǀuu
- San peoples
- ǂKhomani people
- Elsie Vaalbooi
