= Sheena Duncan =

South African activist (1932–2010)

Sheena Duncan GCOB
- Born: 7 December 1932; Johannesburg
- Died: 4 May 2010 (aged 77); Johannesburg, South Africa
- Citizenship: South African
- Education: Roedean School, Johannesburg; Edinburgh College of Domestic Science
- Known for: Human Rights Campaigner
- Spouse: Neil Duncan (d.2003)
- Children: 2
- Parents: Robert Sinclair; Jean Sinclair

Sheena Duncan (7 December 1932 – 4 May 2010) was a South African anti-Apartheid activist and counselor. Duncan was the daughter of Jean Sinclair, one of the co-founders of the Black Sash, a group of white, middle-class South African women who offered support to black South Africans and advocated the non-violent abolishment of the Apartheid system. Duncan served two terms as the leader of Black Sash.

== Background ==
Sheena was born in Johannesburg, South Africa in 1932 of parents Robert and Jean Sinclair. Her father an accountant, was born in Scotland and came to South Africa after the First World War and was influenced by his views of the oppression of land clearance in Highlands of Scotland. Her mother Jean was involved in local politics in the United Party, Progressive Party and as city councilor. She was the eldest of five children, one sister and three brothers, and attended the Roedean School in Johannesburg where the principal, Ella la Maitre's religious and liberal views would influence Duncan's life. During her youth she spent some time in Southern Rhodesia before leaving for Scotland where she was educated at the Edinburgh College of Domestic Science, qualifying in 1953. On her return to South Africa she married architect Neil Duncan in 1955 and the settled in Southern Rhodesia where she worked as a teacher of domestic science. They stayed there for eight years before returning to South Africa in 1963 and joining the Black Sash and would be the chairman of the Transvaal region. On the retirement of her mother in 1975, Duncan became president of the Black Sash from 1975 until 1978 then serving as vice president before being elected again in 1982 until 1986. She would spend her time at the organization editing the Black Sash magazine and managing the Johannesburg branch of the Sash's advice office. She was also the Sash's National Coordinator of the Advice Offices and a member of the Sash's national executive and a founding member of the Black Sash Trust.

In addition to her Black Sash work, her work as a Human Rights campaigner include her as a member of the National Coordinating Committee for the Return of Exiles, the Independent Board of Inquiry into Informal Repression, a Patron of the Society for the Abolition of the Death Penalty and worked with the End Conscription Campaign.

Her religious work included issues concerning justice and peace within the Anglican church and non-violent direct action and would become one of two female canons, prior to women being ordained as priests in South Africa, as Canon of the Cathedral Church of St Mary the Virgin in Johannesburg. She would become the Vice-president of the South African Council of Churches in 1987 until 1990 and then as Senior Vice-President of the same group from 1990 until 1993.

== Published works ==
Duncan wrote several articles, booklets and pamphlets, especially on issues such as forced removals and pass laws. In the 1970s, she joined the Anglican Church's Challenge Group, a movement that sought to end racism within the church. She also represented the Anglican Church on the South African Council of Churches' (SACC) Justice and Reconciliation Division.

- Duncan, Sheena (1992). The Church's Role in Preparing for Free and Fair Elections. Diaconia. ISBN 9780620180399.
- Duncan, Sheena (1968). The disruption of African family life. South African Institute of Race Relations.
- Duncan, Sheena (1993). The People, These Persons, Or Me. Centre for Applied Legal Studies, University of the Witwatersrand. ISBN 978-1-86838-056-5.
- Duncan, Sheena; Adler, Josie; Glover, Glenda (1991). Land and Affordable Safe Homes for All. Black Sash.
- Standing, Guy; Samson, Michael (2003). A Basic Income Grant for South Africa. Juta and Company Ltd. ISBN 978-1-919713-86-1.

== Awards ==
For her activism, Duncan was the 1986 recipient of the Liberal International Prize For Freedom. She was also awarded the Order of Simon of Cyrene, by the Anglican Church of Southern Africa and made Grand Counsellor of the Order of the Baobab (in Silver). She received honorary doctorates from the University of Cape Town (1991), the University of the Witwatersrand (1990) and the University of KwaZulu-Natal.

- The Order of the Baobab in Silver
- The Order of Simon of Cyrene

== Death ==
Duncan died at her home in Johannesburg, South Africa, of cancer on 4 May 2010, at the age of 77. She had two daughters, Lindsay McTeague and Carey Haouach.
