= Noria Mabasa =

South African Venda artist (born 1938)

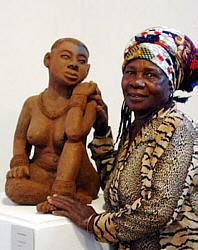
- Born: May 10, 1938 (age 88); Xigalo, Transvaal Province, Union of South Africa

Noria Muelwa Mabasa (née Luvhimbi) (born May 10, 1938) is a South African artist renowned for her exceptional woodcarving skills. She's known for her intricate sculptures that often reflect themes of African culture, spirituality, and everyday life. Mabasa's work has been exhibited internationally, and she's considered one of the leading contemporary artists in South Africa. Her journey and dedication to her craft inspire many within and beyond the art world.

== Early life ==
Noria Muelwa Luvhimbi was born on May 10, 1938, in Shigalo (Xigalo) village, Limpopo Province (then the Transvaal Province). She was the third child born in her family with two older sisters. In 1955, she married Jim Mabasa. In 1965 Luvhimbi separated from Mabasa after she fell ill with a mysterious illness. Mabasa became impatient with her and eventually ordered her to leave his home, upon which she went back to her birthplace in Shigalo.

== Career ==
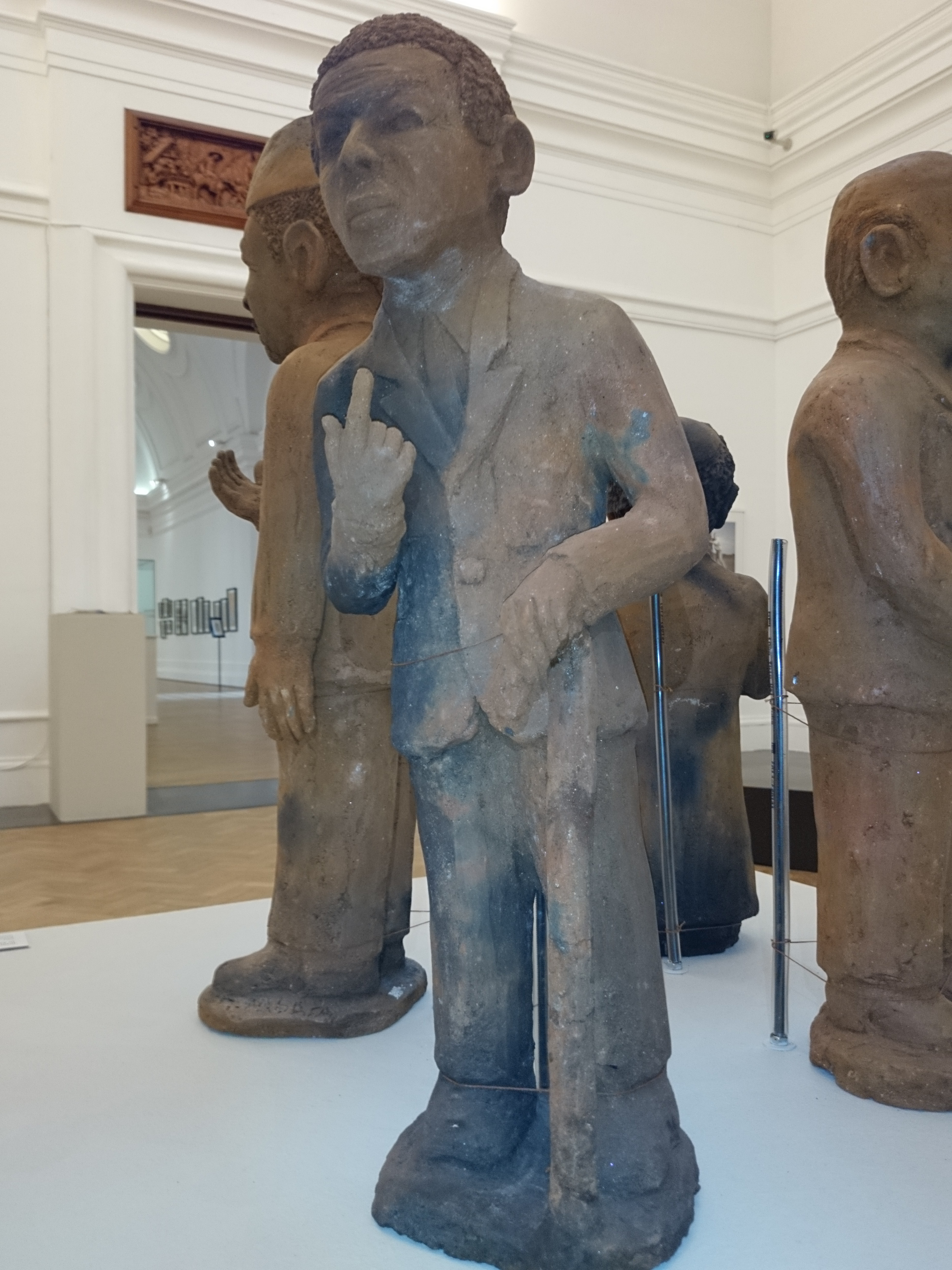
Iziko sang Former President Nelson Mandela

Noria Mabasa completed one year of formal education at a school located three hours walking distance from her childhood home, but had to discontinue schooling because of household chores. In 1965 she began having recurring dreams of an old woman who showed her how to work in the clay medium, and prompted her to receive local training on the traditional craft. Her first clay figures were often small and were mostly given away to local children. She continues to create work inspired by the messages and visions of her dreams.

She began working with clay in 1974 and two years later, in 1976, she became the first Tsonga woman to work in wood. She received local training.

Mabasa has been working as an artist since 1976. She was encouraged to begin woodcarving after the suggestion of Venda sculptor Nelson Makhuba in 1983. Her earliest figures were modelled after clay and wood matano figures used in domba initiation ceremonies. Mabasa initially found recognition on both the national and international art scenes in the 1980s with her ceramic figures painted with enamel paint. Her naturalistic figures are coil-built and fired in an open straw fire. Her current work combines the figurative and the functional; pots often take the shape of the female figure or feature faces.

== Works ==
Known for her pottery and wood sculptures, she is a recipient of the 2002 Silver category of the Order of the Baobab, also receiving several other national and international accolades and awards for her outstanding artistry and creativity.

Mabasa's works deal mostly with the metaphysical and feminine, particularly issues pertaining to women, as well as subjects of Venda mythology and spirituality. She mainly works with clay from her local river bank and wood for her art pieces. Her choice to create wooden sculptures was partly informed by practicality - she stated that wood "isn't as fragile as clay."

- Her wooden sculpture named The Flood (1994) took her nine months to create. The entire sculpture is made out of a fig tree trunk. She wanted to depict the devastation of floods on local villages. It is currently displayed in the foyer of the Sandton Convention Center in Johannesburg.
- Her famous work of The Drum of Thunder follows the story of the Singo people and their mystical drum. It sold for 150,000 South African Rand (US$8,598.66) during an auction in 2017.
- Union Buildings (1999) is another of her famous works.

Currently, Mabasa has a functioning gallery in her home of Tshino Village, located just outside the city of Thohoyandou.

== Sources ==
- Arnold, Marion and Brenda Schmahmann. Between Union and Liberation: Women Artists in South Africa 1910–1990. Burlington, VT: Ashgate, 2005.
- Visonà, Monica B., Robin Poynor, and Herbert M. Cole. A History of Art in Africa. 2nd Ed. New York: Harry N. Abrams, 2001.

== Bibliography ==
Perryer, Sophie (2004). 10 Years 100 Artists: Art In A Democratic South Africa. Cape Town: Struik. ISBN 978-1868729876.
