= ǀXam and ǂKhomani heartland =

ǂKhomani Cultural Landscape
UNESCO World Heritage Site
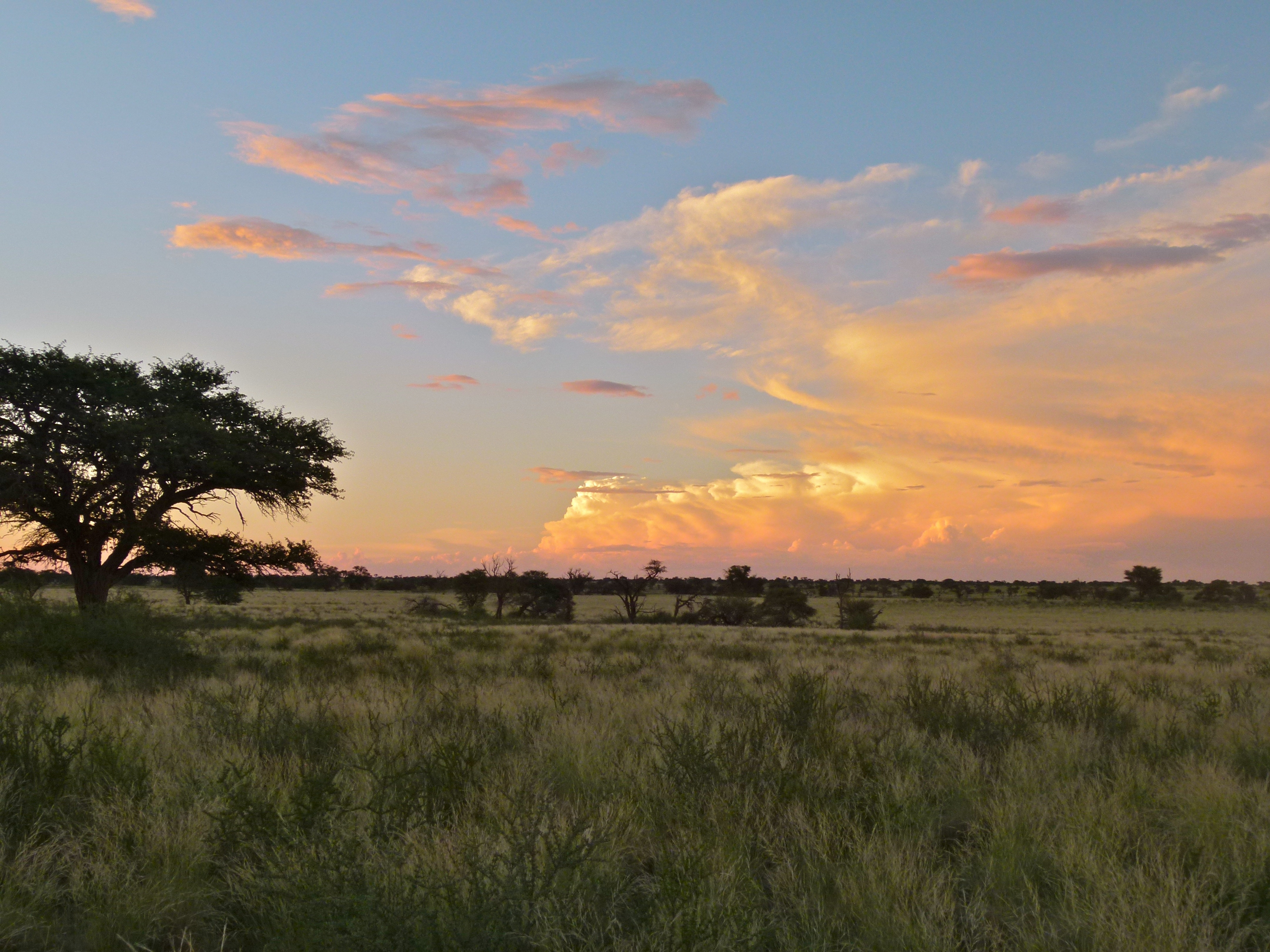
- Nossob Riverbed, Kgalagadi Transfrontier Park

- Location within Northern Cape Location within South Africa
- Interactive map of ǂKhomani Cultural Landscape
- Location: Northern Cape, South Africa
- Criteria: Cultural: (iv), (v)
- Reference: 1545
- Inscription: 2017 (41st Session)
- Coordinates: 25°41′15.4″S 20°22′28.5″E

The ǀXam and ǂKhomani heartland World Heritage Site consists of regions located to the South and North of Upington, respectively, in the Northern Cape Province of South Africa. The ǀXam and ǂKhomani (more correctly Nǁnǂe) people were linguistically related groups of San (Bushman) people, their respective languages (ǀXam and Nǁng) being part of the ǃKwi language group. Descendants of both the ǀXam and Nǁnǂe include Afrikaans-speaking ‘Coloured’ people on farms or in towns in the region amongst whom the precolonial languages are either entirely extinct (in the case of ǀXam) or can be spoken by but a very few people (in the case of Nǁnǂe).

== Site description ==
The two areas consist of semi-arid to arid tracts of the Upper Karoo (to the south) and the Southern Kalahari (to the north). Both areas are rich in archaeological traces inter alia of the Later Stone Age, while rocky hills and outcrops in the southern area (which has been referred to as ǀXam-ka ǃxau, meaning home of the ǀXam) have a wealth of rock art sites, preponderantly in the form of rock engravings. In the ǂKhomani area to the north (where the sandy desert topography precludes rock art) a cultural mapping project contributes to a revival of interest in cultural traditions in the younger generation.

== History ==
With the official proclamation of the Kalahari Gemsbok National Park in 1931, the majority of the Khomani, as well as the Mier people who lived in that area, were forced to move to other areas.

== World Heritage Status ==
The ǀXam and ǂKhomani heartland site was added to the UNESCO World Heritage Tentative List on May 15, 2004 in the Cultural category.

The northern component, the ǂKhomani Cultural Landscape, was inscribed on the World Heritage list on 8 July 2017, during the 41st session of the United Nations Education, Scientific and Cultural Organisation (UNESCO) World Heritage Committee which took place in Kraków, Poland, 2–12 July 2017.
