= Order of the Baobab =

South African civilian national honour

Awarded by President of South Africa
- Type: National Order
- Eligibility: South African citizens
- Awarded for: Service
- Status: Currently constituted
- Grades: Supreme Counsellor (SCOB); Grand Counsellor (GCOB); Counsellor (COB)

Statistics
- First induction: 10 December 2002
- Total inductees: 100
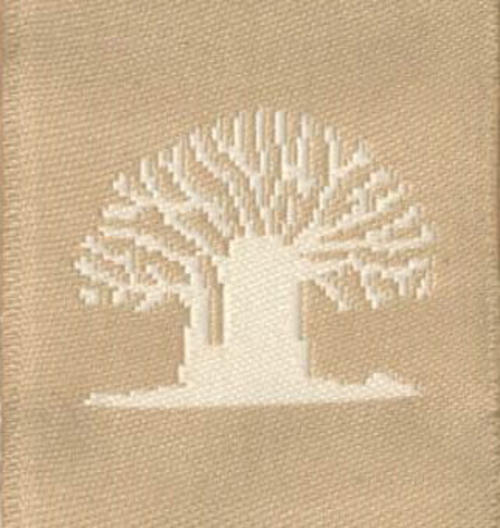
- Ribbon section

The Order of the Baobab is a South African civilian national honour, awarded to those for service in business and the economy; science, medicine, and for technological innovation; and community service. It was instituted on 6 December 2002, and is awarded annually by the President of South Africa. The order is named after the baobab tree, which was chosen as a symbol because of its endurance and tolerance, its vitality, its importance in agro-forestry systems, and its use as a meeting place in traditional African societies.

Until the Order of Luthuli and the Order of Ikhamanga were established in 2004, the Order of the Baobab also covered service in the fields now covered by those orders.

== Current classes ==
The three classes of appointment to the order are, in descending order of precedence:

- Supreme Counsellor of the Baobab in gold, for exceptional service (SCOB)
- Grand Counsellor of the Baobab in silver, for distinguished service (GCOB)
- Counsellor of the Baobab in bronze, for dedicated service (COB)

== Symbolism ==
The central motif is a baobab tree, one of the oldest trees in Africa, with roots symbolising longevity. The badge is bordered by a nonagon shape, a nine-sided polygon, with each side representing one of the nine South African provinces. It represents the many different areas of possible contribution and service, in building a prosperous nation. The roughly rectangular shaped plaque, is textured to represent the baobab tree bark that is commonly used to make mats and hats.

The ribbon is gold, with recurring cream-coloured baobab silhouettes down the centre. All three classes are worn around the neck. The South African coat of arms is displayed on the reverse of the badge.

Award variations
Lapel Rosette	Miniature	Neck Decoration
Order of The Baobab - Lapel Rosette	Order of The Baobab - Miniature	Order of The Baobab - Neck decoration

== Recipients ==
These are all the recipients, in order of most recent:

Name	Grade	Date awarded
Ms Zukiswa Patricia Matolengwe	SCOB	23 April 2024
Ms Blanche la Guma (Posthumous)	SCOB	23 April 2024
Mr Cornelius Ruald Strydom	GCOB	28 April 2023
Justice Edwin Cameron	SCOB	18 November 2021
Professor Lynette Denny	GCOB	18 November 2021
David Ingpen	GCOB	18 November 2021
Nolwandle Mboweni	GCOB	18 November 2021
Dr Hlamalani Judith Ngwenya	COB	18 November 2021
Dr Ray and Mrs Dora Phillips (Posthumous)	GCOB	25 April 2019
Mr Bongani Donald Mkhwanazi (Posthumous)	GCOB	25 April 2019
Mr Braam Jordaan	GCOB	25 April 2019
Mr William Smith	GCOB	25 April 2019
Ms Constance Mirriam Thokozile Koza (Posthumous)	GCOB	25 April 2019
Mr Maduke Lot Ndlovu (Posthumous)	GCOB	28 April 2018
Nkosinathi Freddy Ndlovu	GCOB	28 April 2018
Ms Violet Jacobeth Seboni (Posthumous)	GCOB	28 April 2018
Ms Nokutela Dube (Posthumous)	SCOB	28 April 2017
Mr Milner Langa Kabane (1900–1945) (Posthumous)	GCOB	28 April 2017
Ms Getrude Ntlabati (Posthumous)	GCOB	28 April 2017
Ms Pfarelo Rebecca Ramugondo	COB	28 April 2017
Prof Olive Shisana	COB	28 April 2017
Ms Marina Nompinti Maponya (Posthumous)	SCOB	27 April 2016
Prof Helen Rees	GCOB	27 April 2016
Prof Rosina Mamokgethi Phakeng	GCOB	27 April 2016
Professor Emeritus James David Lewis-Williams	SCOB	8 December 2015
Douglas John Anderson	GCOB	8 December 2015
Dr Andrew Ross	GCOB	8 December 2015
Dr Mary Susan Makobatjatji Malahlela (Posthumous)	GCOB	8 December 2015
Otto Stehlik	GCOB	8 December 2015
Justice Yvonne Mokgoro	COB	8 December 2015
Alex Boraine	GCOB	27 April 2014
Chris Ball	GCOB	27 April 2014
Dawid Kruiper (Posthumous)	GCOB	27 April 2014
Frederik van Zyl Slabbert (Posthumous)	GCOB	27 April 2014
Katrina Esau	GCOB	27 April 2014
Raymond Ackerman	GCOB	27 April 2014
Abraham September (Posthumous)	COB	27 April 2014
Tshepo Thobakgale Khumbane	COB	27 April 2014
Colin Wells Eglin	GCOB	27 April 2013
David Jacobus Bosch (Posthumous)	GCOB	27 April 2013
Dr Sayed Mohamed Ridwan Mia	GCOB	27 April 2013
Herbert William Garnet De La Hunt	GCOB	27 April 2013
Yusuf Abramjee	GCOB	27 April 2013
Nontsikelelo Qwelane	COB	27 April 2013
Suraya “Bibi” Khan	COB	27 April 2013
Frank Kennan Dutton	SCOB	27 April 2012
Lwandle Wilson Magadla (Posthumous)	SCOB	27 April 2012
Daniel Gerhardus Krige	GCOB	27 April 2012
Gladys Ramahuta	COB	27 April 2012
Selwyn “Scully” Levin	COB	27 April 2012
Zane Maureen Wilson	COB	27 April 2012
Rev Phambani Jeremiah Mzimba (1850 – )	SCOB	27 April 2011
Bishop David Patrick Russell (1938 – )	GCOB	27 April 2011
William Sinclair Winship (1927 – )	GCOB	27 April 2011
Nowongile Cynthia Molo (1949 – )	COB	27 April 2011
Reginald Dudley Forde (1940 – )	COB	27 April 2011
James Mata Dwane (1848–1916)	SCOB	27 April 2010
Joseph Sepp Blatter (1936 – )	SCOB	27 April 2010
Imtiaz Sooliman	GCOB	27 April 2010
Malebone Luthuli (1935 – )	GCOB	27 April 2010
Malefu Mphathane	GCOB	27 April 2010
Vincent Naidoo	GCOB	27 April 2010
Aanon Michael Rosholt (1920 – )	GCOB	27 March 2009
Cyril Ramaphosa (1952 – )	GCOB	27 March 2009
Ethel Normoyle (1944 – )	GCOB	27 March 2009
Irene Menell (1932 – )	GCOB	27 March 2009
Masenyeki Priscilla Mokone (1906–2008)	GCOB	27 March 2009
Roelf Petrus Meyer (1947 – )	GCOB	27 March 2009
Khoza Elliot Mbuyisa Mgojo	COB	27 March 2009
Malethola Maggie Nkwe (1938 – )	COB	27 March 2009
Rashaka Frank Ratshitanga (1933 – )	COB	27 March 2009
Nana Henrietta Moabi (1938 – )	SCOB	28 October 2008
Pius Nkonzo Langa (1939 – )	SCOB	28 October 2008
Sir Sydney Kentridge (1922 – )	SCOB	28 October 2008
Franklin Sonn (1939 – )	GCOB	28 October 2008
Wiseman Lumkile Nkuhlu (1944 – )	GCOB	28 October 2008
Raymond Bill Hoffenberg (1923–2007)	GCOB	28 October 2008
Theo Kotze (1920–2003)	GCOB	28 October 2008
Winston Njongonkulu Ndungane (1941 – )	GCOB	28 October 2008
Filippus Letla Mminele (1892–1971)	COB	28 October 2008
Rebecca Beka Ntsanwisi (1968 – )	COB	28 October 2008
Ruth Machobane(1939 – )	COB	28 October 2008
Zodwa Mqadi (nee Dlamini) (1942 – )	COB	28 October 2008
Eric Marooi Molobi (1945–2006)	GCOB	24 April 2007
Joyce Piliso-Seroke (1933 – )	GCOB	24 April 2007
Rev Dale White	GCOB	24 April 2007
Richard John Pelwana Maponya	GCOB	24 April 2007
Sally Motlana (1927 – )	GCOB	24 April 2007
Dr Anvir Adam (1937 – )	COB	24 April 2007
Ephraim Sibiya (1949 – )	COB	24 April 2007
Epaulette Mbeki (1916 – )	SCOB	20 April 2006
Barney Pityana (1945 – )	GCOB	20 April 2006
Grace Masuku (1932 – )	GCOB	20 April 2006
Lindiwe Myeza (1935 – )	GCOB	20 April 2006
Mamohau Ntsoane (1952 – )	GCOB	20 April 2006
Sheena Duncan (1932 – )	GCOB	20 April 2006
T. Wolfram Kistner (1923 – )	GCOB	20 April 2006
Ivan Toms	COB	20 April 2006
Job Richard Rathebe (1897–1982)	SCOB	26 April 2005
University of Fort Hare (1916 – )	SCOB	26 April 2005
Ethel Barlow	GCOB	26 April 2005
Revel Albert Ellis Fox (1924–2004)	GCOB	26 April 2005
Urbania Bebe Mothopeng (1917 – )	GCOB	26 April 2005
Marjorie Manganye (1931 – )	COB	26 April 2005
Fabian Defu Ribeiro (1933–1986)	SCOB	16 June 2004
Grogoriyevich Vassili Solodovnikov (1918 – )	SCOB	16 June 2004
Brigalia Bam (1933 – )	GCOB	16 June 2004
Dora Ndaba (1945 – )	GCOB	16 June 2004
Helenard Joe (Allan) Hendrickse (1927 – )	GCOB	16 June 2004
Jean Sinclair	GCOB	16 June 2004
Edna Freinkel (1932 – )	COB	16 June 2004
Mirriam Cele (1935 – )	COB	16 June 2004
Mpho Sebanyoni-Mothlasedi (1959 – )	COB	16 June 2004
Prince Cabangukuhle Penuel Zulu (1928 – )	COB	16 June 2004
Arthur Chaskalson	SCOB	20 December 2002
Friedel Sellschop	SCOB	20 December 2002
Ismail Mahomed	SCOB	20 December 2002
Marinus Daling	SCOB	20 December 2002
Mark Shope	SCOB	20 December 2002
Moses Mabhida	SCOB	20 December 2002
Tamsanqa Kambule	SCOB	20 December 2002
Adelaide Tambo	GCOB	20 December 2002
Bishop Hamilton Mvumelwano Dandala	GCOB	20 December 2002
Jan Haggie	GCOB	20 December 2002
Noria Mabasa	GCOB	20 December 2002
Sam Motswenyane	GCOB	20 December 2002
Stuart Saunders	GCOB	20 December 2002
Yvonne Muthien	GCOB	20 December 2002
Adele Searll (1944–1998)	COB	20 December 2002
Clara Basenjeng Masinga	COB	20 December 2002
Eva Mokoka	COB	20 December 2002
Thelma Henderson	COB	20 December 2002
Noel Chabani Manganyi	SCOB	14 May 2026
Kubedi Patrick Mokhobo	GCOB	14 May 2026
Pumla Gobodo-Madikizela	COB	14 May 2026

== See also ==
- South African civil honours
