= Mary Maytham Kidd =

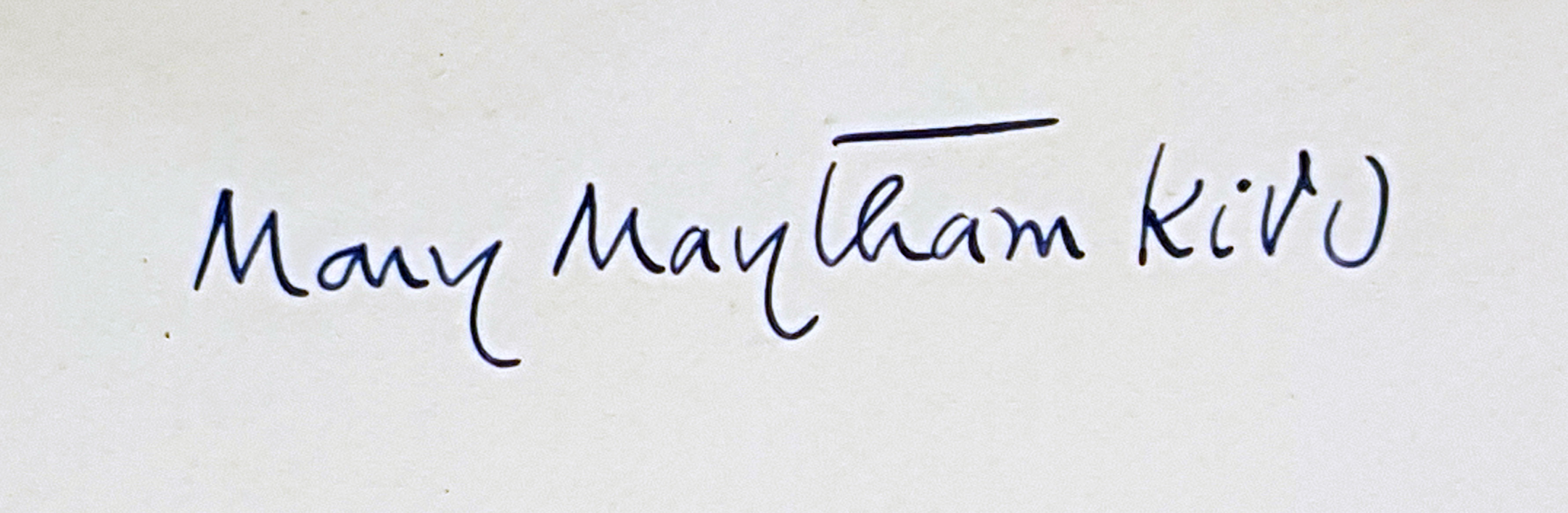

Mary Maytham Kidd born Mary Catherine Maytham (24 January 1914 – 8 April 2001 East London, Cape Province), daughter of Albert Archibald Maytham, was a South African botanical artist.

Born in East London, she was educated at Roedean School in Johannesburg between 1927 and 1930 and, between 1931 and 1933, studied at the Sorbonne in Paris. She also trained at the Royal Academy School in London from 1936 to 1938.

Kidd wrote and illustrated "Wild Flowers of the Cape Peninsula" (Cape Town 1950 - foreword by J. C. Smuts), two books on South African poisonous and edible fungi by Edith L. Stephens (Longmans, Cape Town 1953) and illustrated a series of booklets on protected wild flowers for the Cape Province Nature Conservation Department. Her 1950 work, "Wild Flowers of the Cape Peninsula", was recently republished as "Wild Flowers of the Table Mountain National Park", by the Botanical Society of South Africa. She also created designs for porcelain, Christmas cards and calendars.

The University of Cape Town archives acquired her sketchbooks, diaries and other documents after her death. They show that she undertook a 1936 canoe trip down the Danube and visited Nyasaland and the Zomba Plateau in 1943. Much later in 1973/74, she spent some time in Suffolk.

She married Hubert John Kidd (1896-1963), headmaster of the Diocesan College of Bishops in Rondebosch, on 28 May 1948. They adopted a child, Charles James Anthony Kidd (1942-2005). Mary died of congestive cardiac failure on 8 April 2001 in Maitland, Cape Town.
