= James Mata Dwane =

African Methodist priest (1848–1916)

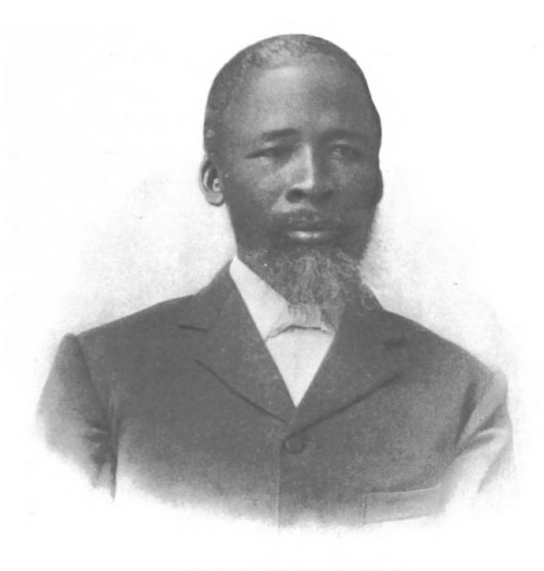
James Mata Dwane (c. 1895)

James Mata Dwane (1848–1916), priest and founder of the Order of Ethiopia.

== Early life ==
Dwane was born in Kamastone near Whittlesea, Eastern Cape, in 1848. He was educated and later taught at Healdtown Methodist Missionary Institution.

At the mere age of 19, he decided to start a school in a nearby village and enrolled 60 learners whom he taught all he had learned. He then left for further education and formal teacher training at Healdtown Methodist Missionary Institution where he later served as a teacher. During this time, he became painfully aware of the difference in quality between white and black education.

In an effort to advance his education vision he joined John Tengo Jabavu in a local newspaper in King William's Town as Co-editor for Imvo Zabantsundu (Black Opinion).

== Methodist minister ==
After a period as a lay minister, Dwane returned to Healdtown in 1872 to study theology. His studies completed, he began his work as a probationer minister by assisting the Rev'd Robert Lamplough at the Ann Shaw church, Middeldrift. He was ordained as a Methodist minister in Port Elizabeth in 1881. Dwane served as a minister in a number of places in the Eastern and Northern Cape.

In 1892, Dwane went to England to collect money for the work of the Methodist church in South Africa. Dwane hoped to collect money to start an industrial school near Queenstown. His tour successful and he returned with a large amount of money. However, on his return, the Methodist authorities insisted that the money be paid into the general fund. Dwane was thoroughly disillusioned and this dispute over money led directly to his leaving the Methodist Church and joining the Ethiopian Church of Mangena Mokone.

== Ethiopian Church ==
In 1896, when Dwane joined the Ethiopian Church, the amalgamation with the African Methodist Episcopal Church (AMEC) in America was being discussed. Dwane and two others were elected to go to America, but in the end only Dwane could raise the money so he went alone.

Eventually the House of Bishops and the Missionary Board of AMEC agreed to the amalgamation. Dwane was re-ordained (as bishop) and sent back as General Superintendent (GS) of the South African AMEC.

== Anglican Church ==
Dwane became suspicious of the validity of the orders into which he had been inducted as bishop. The vicar of the Anglican Church in Queenstown, the Rev'd Julius Gordon, introduced Dwane to the Rt Rev'd Charles Cornish, Bishop of Grahamstown. Dwane became convinced that the Anglicans had the true Apostolic succession, and in 1899, he wrote to the Most Rev'd William West Jones, Archbishop of Cape Town to negotiate the admission of the breakaway Ethiopians to the Anglican Church as a separate order.

In August 1900 a service was held in Grahamstown Cathedral at which Dwane was formally accepted into the fellowship of the Anglican Church. After making the necessary vows he was admitted as the Provincial superior of the Order of Ethiopia, but he was not consecrated as a bishop.

The Anglican Church was slow to ordain ministers for the Order of Ethiopia. In 1902, fifty-three candidates from Queenstown were confirmed and twelve men were licensed as catechists but not as priests. The same year the Rev. W. M. Cameron was put in charge of training 'Ethiopian theological students' . Dwane assisted Cameron with the work of teaching the students.

== Difficulties and disagreements ==
At a conference in 1905, Dwane complained that Ethiopian ministers had to work under white priests. The bishop firmly reminded the Ethiopians that they were "first members of the Church of the Province of South Africa and secondly members of the Order of Ethiopia". Dwane was criticized by the church authorities for taking part in commercial transactions. Two years later Dwane was replaced as Provincial. Cameron reported to the archbishop that 'the bishops of the province have not reappointed Mr. Dwane as provincial' and that he, Cameron, had been appointed acting-provincial. Dwane remained a priest in the Order of Ethiopia until his death in 1916, and never became a bishop.

Dwane's great-grandson, Bishop S. Dwane, became the first black bishop of the Order of Ethiopia; the position that his great grandfather had sought but never achieved.

== Awards ==
The Order of the Baobab in Gold by then president Jacob Zuma for his contribution to the formation of the African Methodist Episcopal Church and educational development of Africans.

== Literature contribution ==
Dwane wrote a book called Imaz'enethole (Cow and Calf).

== Commemoration ==
The Anglican Church of Southern Africa commemorates Dwane in its Calendar of saints on the 9th day of February each year. In addition the collect for this commemoration is as follows:

God our Father, our teacher and our guide
your servant James Mata Dwane
preached the gospel of your Son
and lived the gospel which he preached;
grant that all of us by our lives
may proclaim the gospel that he taught;
through Jesus Christ our Lord, Amen.
