= Order of Simon of Cyrene =

Highest award given by the Anglican Church of Southern Africa

The Order of Simon of Cyrene is the highest award given by the Anglican Church of Southern Africa to laity for distinguished service. It was established in 1960, during the tenure of Archbishop Joost de Blank, following a proposal by Bishop Robert Selby Taylor. Membership of the order is limited to 120 persons. The order is named after Simon of Cyrene, the first saint on the African continent.

== Living members of the order ==
1. Michael Cassidy (1983)
2. Barry Smith (1989)
3. Ingrid Le Roux (1991)
4. Esrom Mulaudzi (1993)
5. Robin Black (1998)
6. Brigalia Bam (1999)
7. Max Hales (1999)
8. John Stephen Martin (1999)
9. Malethola Maggie Nkwe (2002)
10. John Ramsdale (2002)
11. Leah Tutu (2005)
12. Maggy Clarke (2006)
13. Justice (ret'd) Ian Farlam (2006)
14. David Sheppard (2007)
15. Tessa Fairbairn (2007)
16. Denise M. Ackerman (2008)
17. Lavinia Crawford-Browne (2008)
18. Sinah Mokati (2008)
19. Gerald Hendricks
20. Chief Mangosuthu Buthelezi (2010)
21. Lily Cloete (2010)
22. Advocate Deon Irish (2010)
23. Mamphela Ramphele (2010)
24. John Kingsley-Hall (2011)
25. Robin Greenwood (2011)
26. Monica Koopman (2011)
27. Grant Nupen (2013)
28. Saki Macozoma (2013)
29. Gail Allen (2013)
30. Michael Whisson (2013)
31. Dr Mary Jean Silk (2014)
32. Sally Motlana (2017)
33. Shirley Moulder (2017)

== Deceased members ==
1. Alan Paton (awarded 1963; died 1988)
2. Maureen Petersen (1950 - 2014)
3. Mary Davidson (order awarded 1968)
4. Adelaide Tambo (1997)
5. John Michael Berning 14 December 1941 - 17 December 2006 (order awarded 2008 posthumously)
6. Dennis Burkinshaw 1918 - 2013 (order awarded ?)
7. Neville Paul Greeham died 15 December 2005
8. Sheena Duncan died 4 May 2010
9. Allan Bryant Crawford (1 August 1912 - 26 February 2007) order awarded in 1963
10. Patrick Dumisa (b abt 1917 d 12 Jan 2007)
11. Mary Knowling (21 October 1923 - 31 January 2013) (order awarded 2011)
12. Pat Gorvalla died 12 November 2013
13. Sheila Rose Maspero died on 25 January 2014 (order awarded 1985)
14. Helen King died in 2015 (order awarded in 1996)
15. Pippa Vincent died 15 September 2015
16. Helen Joseph order awarded in 1992, Joseph died in December 1992
17. Dorrie Nuttall died November 2016 (order awarded 2005)
18. Emma Mashinini (awarded 2016, died 10 July 2017)
19. William Hugh Paterson (1873-1963) order awarded posthumously in 1963
20. Sir Rupert Bromley (2012) died 2018
21. Ronald Kenneth Kirby (awarded 1966, died 1989)
22. John David Emery (2017) admitted on Saturday, 25 November 2017.
23. Margaret Elsworth died 6 October 2023, order awarded in 2010
