= Zulu Congregational Church =

Coordinates: 26.2485°S 27.9316°E

The Zulu Congregational Church is a Congregational Church in South Africa.

== History ==
The Zulu Congregational Church is one of the oldest African Ethiopian churches in South Africa, it was founded on 21 March 1896 by Rt Rev Simungu Bafazini Shibe at Denver Zoar Umzumbe, KZN. It was formed as an independent of the previous American Zulu Mission at The Table Mountain Mission Station is situated forty miles northwest of Durban in Pietermaritzburg, was founded by American missionary, Samuel D. Marsh, in 1848. Marsh was forced to abandon the station owing to ill health, and from 1850 it was administered by Jacob Dohne, formerly of the Berlin Missionary Society. In 1860 Dohne left the AZM to rejoin his parent society. From that date until 1896, Table Mountain was without the services of a resident missionary. The Mission was limited by a perennial staff shortage throughout the nineteenth century, making it impossible to spare a missionary for an isolated station.

In 1875 African preacher Daniel Njaleki was appointed by the AZM to take charge of Table Mountain station. Njaleki began the construction of a church and by 1877 it had a membership of twenty-four.

In 1888 Njaleki left the mission after ill health and the mission applied for a replacement. Simungu Shibe was selected by the congregation and subsequently approved by the Mission. In 1896, G.J. Pugh, the former treasurer of the NCU, became missionary-in-charge of Table Mountain. Upon his arrival Pugh asked for the Shibe's removal. A large portion of the converts came out openly in support of Shibe.

At the pastors' conference in June 1897 the pastors cited the self-support circular from America as justification for their demand that the congregation at Table Mountain be allowed to select its own ministers. Conflict erupted as the NCU wrote to the American Board of the Reserves requesting Shibe's removal. The American Board refused to intervene. In February 1898, Shibe travelled to Johannesburg, where along with Fokothi Makhanya of the Johannesburg Church, he was ordained pastor. John Langalibalele Dube helped Rev Shibe to form the ZCC. In 1917 one of the best Zulu Congregational Church preachers Gardner B. Mvuyane of the Johannesburg mission ceded from the Zulu Congregational Church and founded his own Church, the African Congregational Church. In 1924 Shibe died

After Shibe's death Rt Rev Aaron Mpanza took over as the president of the Church up until his death in 1956 under his leadership the church membership grew from 20 000 to over 50 000 members as it established missions in Natal, Transkei, Gazankulu and Kwa Ndebele, the church also adopted the new uniform which had the blue, white and black colors, hymn book and prayer books (incwadi yombhedesho) then Rt Rev A.P. Ntombela took over as the president of the church from 1955 until 1976 when Rt Rev H.J. Smith took over the leadership of the church until his death in 1995. The church comprises three unions which are the Volunteers Union, W.C.U (Women's Union) uManyano and the Men's Union. Today the church has over 80 000 members across South Africa as it found in the provinces of KwaZulu-Natal, Gauteng, Mpumalanga, Eastern Cape And North West.

== Presidents ==
The list Presidents is:

- Rt Rev S.B Shibe 1896-1924
- Rt Rev A.D. Mpanza 1925-1956
- Rt Rev A.P. Ntombela 1956-1976
- Rt Rev H.J. Smith 1976-1995
- Rt Rev E.J. Bhengu 1995-1999 (Acting)
- Rt Rev P.M. Ngcobo 1999-2004
- Rt Rev M.T. Ngubane 2006-
