= ǂKhomani people =

ǂKhomani
Nǁnǂe

Total population
- 500 (est.)

Languages
- Nǁng (Historically), Afrikaans, Khoekhoe, South African English

Religion
- San Religion, Christianity

Related ethnic groups
- San, Coloured People, Nama, Khoisan

The ǂKhomani (/koʊˈmæniː/ koh-MAN-ee), or Nǁnǂe, are San (Bushmen) people of South Africa who traditionally spoke the Tuu language Nǁng. In 2019, their population was estimated to be around 500, with an unknown number of those with ǂKhomani ancestry.

Until the 20th century, ǂKhomani spoke Nǁng (commonly referred to as Nǀuu), but as the people shifted to Khoekhoe and Afrikaans, the language lost speakers and now is virtually extinct, with Katrina Esau being regarded as the last living speaker.

Due to intermarrying, ǂKhomani identity has expanded to include the descendants of speakers of other (now extinct) ǃKwi languages.

== See also ==
- San peoples
- ǀXam and ǂKhomani heartland
- Nǁng language
- Katrina Esau
- Dawid Kruiper
