= Kate Otten =

South African architect

- Born: 28 March 1964 (age 61); Durban
- Citizenship: South Africa
- Education: University of the Witwatersrand
- Occupation: Architect
- Website: https://kateottenarchitects.com/

Katherine Maree Otten, usually known as Kate Otten, (born 28 March 1964, Durban) is a South African architect, who has won numerous awards for her South African traditional work.

== Biography ==
Born in Durban, Kate Otten attended Roedean School in Johannesburg, matriculating in 1981. She then studied architecture at the University of the Witwatersrand, graduating in 1987. After working for a number of other practices, Otten established her own firm in 1989 in Johannesburg, just after one year of her graduation. She has designed community libraries, the waterfront development at Tzaneen, an art therapy centre in Soweto and the museum exhibition space at the former Women's Jail at Constitution Hill which received a commendation from the South African Institute of Architects (SAIA). Otten has won many awards including the SAIA Award of Merit House Staude in 1998 to the Mbokodo Awards Architecture and Creative Design in 2013.

== Awards ==
- Sophia Grey Memorial Lecture, Certificate of recognition in 2015.
- Mbokodo Awards Architecture and Creative Design, winner in 2013.
- Architecture and City scape award, Dubai 2009.
- Regional Finaliast Business Women of the Year, 2002.
- SAIA project Award Reptile Centre, 1999.
- SAIA Award of Merit House Staude, 1998.
