= Dread Jesus =

1999 book by William David Spencer

- Author: William David Spencer
- Language: English
- Subject: Rastafari
- Publication date: 1999
- ISBN: 0-281-05101-1

Dread Jesus, published in 1999, is a book written by William David Spencer about the Rastafari movement.
