= Revel Fox =

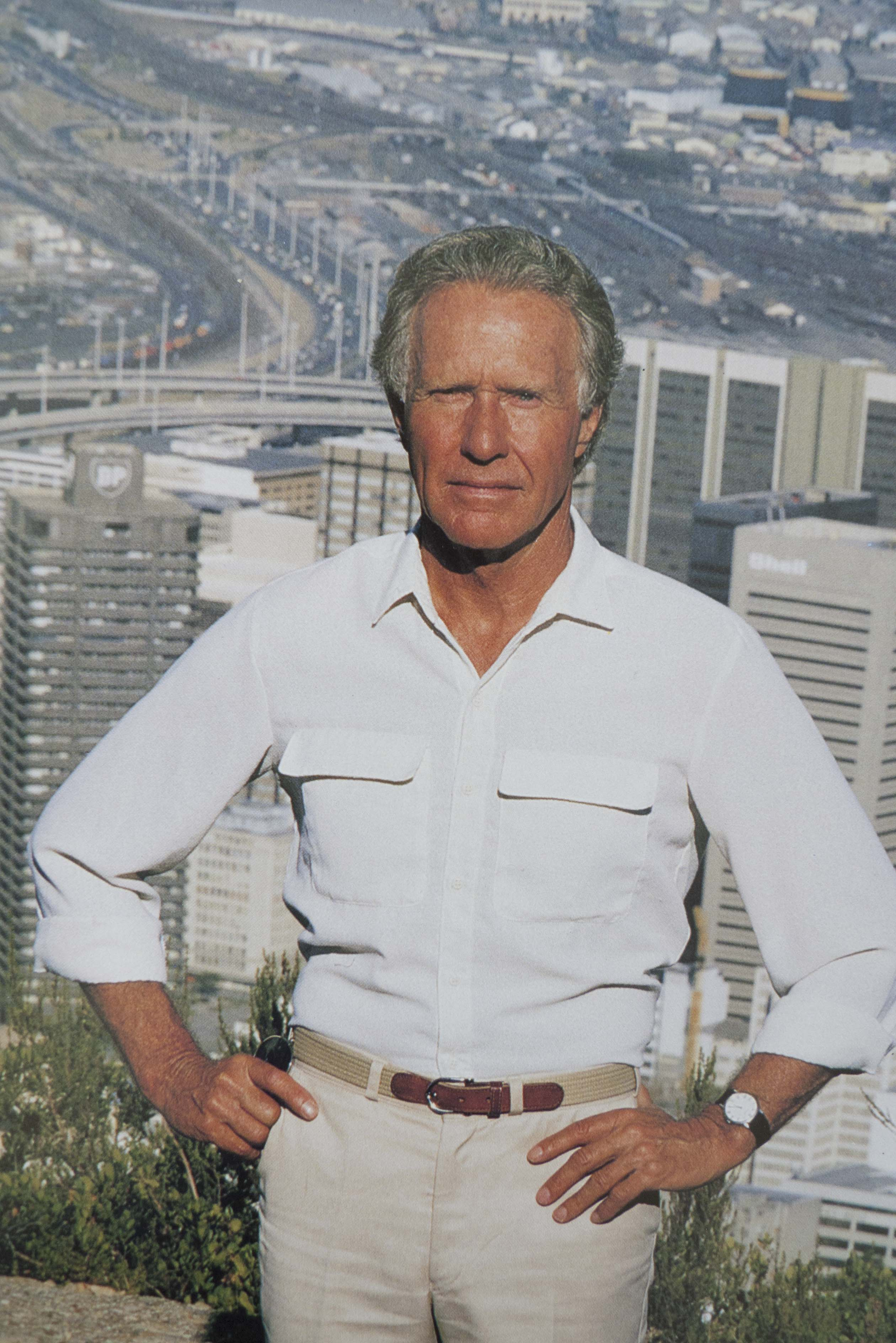
- Born: Revel Albert Ellis Fox; 20 September 1924; Durban
- Died: 13 December 2004 (aged 80)
- Education: University of Cape Town
- Occupation: Architect
- Children: Grethe Fox; Revel Fox Jnr; Justin D. Fox
- Parent(s): Albert John Charles Fox; Ivy Priscilla Ellis
- Practice: Revel Fox and Partners
- Website: www.revelfox.co.za

Revel Albert Ellis Fox GCOB (20 September 1924 – 13 December 2004) was a South African avant-garde architect. Founder of Revel Fox and Partners.

== Life ==
Revel Fox was born in Durban in 1924, in the family of Albert John Charles Fox, a customs officer, and Ivy Priscilla Ellis. By the time he had graduated from Durban Boys' High School World War II had broken out and he wanted to join the army. After 18 months of studying architecture, he enlisted and was sent to Italy as part of the Special Service Battalion. After the War, Revel Fox returned to the University of Cape Town earning a degree in B Arch in 1948 (Honoris Causa) conferred on him by two universities, the University of Natal (1993) and the University of Cape Town (2001). After graduating from the university he worked in the then Rhodesia (Zimbabwe) and in Anders Tengbom's office in Stockholm, Sweden. In 1952 he returned to South Africa, and set up practice in Worcester in the Western Cape, opened practice in the Cape in 1953. In Worcester, he was involved in number of restoration projects.

From 1960 to 1963 he was listed as an assistant lecturer in the staff registers of the University of Cape Town. He obtained the degree of master of Urban and Regional Planning at the University of Cape Town in 1969. From 1973 to 1975 Fox was the president of the Cape Provincial Institute of Architects, 1998 and 1999 he served as Chair of the Council of the University of Cape Town. Revel Fox had been a member of Advisory Board of the Faculty of Engineering and the Built Environment at the University of Cape Town.

Fox was known for opposing the apartheid regime and he was invited to join the delegation which went to Dakar in 1987 to meet with representatives of the then exiled African National Congress.

== Awards ==
- Gold Medal Award from the Institute of South African Architects, 1977.
- South African National Monuments Council's Gold Medal, 1994.
- 9th Sophia Gray Memorial Lecture Laureate, 1997.
- The Order of the Baobab in Silver 26 April 2005 for Lifelong contribution to the advancement of architecture in South Africa.

== Books ==
- Fox, Revel, Fox, Justin & Kotze, Paul. 1998. Revel Fox: reflections on the making of space. Cape Town: Rustica Press.

== Bibliography ==
- Beck, Haig (Editor). 1985. UIA International Architect : Southern Africa (Issue 8). London: International Architect. pp Inner back cover, 10
- Emanuel, Muriel. 1980. Contemporary architects. London: Macmillan. pp 256–259
- Fox, Revel, Fox, Justin. 1998. Revel Fox : reflections on the making of space. Cape Town: Rustica Press. pp All
- Greig, Doreen. 1971. A Guide to Architecture in South Africa. Cape Town: Howard Timmins. pp 228
- ISAA. 1959. The Yearbook of the Institute of South African Architects and Chapter of SA Quantity Surveyors 1958-1959 : Die Jaarboek van die Instituut van Suid-Afrikaanse Argitekte en Tak van Suid-Afrikaanse Bourekenaars 1958-1959. Johannesburg: ISAA. pp 90, 207
- ISAA. 1969. The Yearbook of the Institute of South African Architects and Chapter of SA Quantity Surveyors 1968-1969 : Die Jaarboek van die Instituut van Suid-Afrikaanse Argitekte en Tak van Suid-Afrikaanse Bourekenaars 1968-1969. Johannesburg: ISAA. pp 92, 158
- Martin, Desmond. 2007. Walking Long Street. Cape Town: Struik. pp 16, 20
- Morgan, Ann Lee & Naylor, Colin. 1987 [1980]. Contemporary Architects. Chicago and London: St. James Press. pp 291–294
