= Youth Leadership Camp =

American summer camp

- Camp Taloali in Stayton, Oregon
- Formation: July 27, 1969; 57 years ago
- Coordinates: 44°47′31.53″N 122°43′51.27″W
- Website: youth.nad.org/ylc/

The Youth Leadership Camp (YLC) is an annual four-week leadership program for deaf high school students which has been operating in the United States as a non-profit organization since the late 1960s. Youth Leadership Camp activities are conducted in American Sign Language.

== History ==
From July 27 to August 23, 1969, the first camp was held in Stroudsburg, Pennsylvania. Sixty-four freshmen and sophomore students attended.

From 2005 to the present, the camp has been at Camp Taloali in Stayton, Oregon. Camp Taloali is accredited by the American Camp Association and is associated with the Lions Club in the states of Oregon and Washington.

== Past YLC Locations ==
- 1969: Pine Lake Camp in Stroudsburg, Pennsylvania in The Poconos

Location in Polk County and the state of Florida

- 1970–1989: Swan Lake Lodge in Pengilly, Minnesota
- 1990–2002: Camp Taloali in Stayton, Oregon
- 2003: Camp Lakodia in Madison, South Dakota
- 2004: Sertoma Camp Endeavor in Dundee, Florida near Winter Haven

== See also ==
- PEN-International
- Project Insight
