= Gauteng Institute for Architecture =

South African professional organization

Coordinates: 26.14710°S 28.05480°E

Gauteng Institute for Architects
- Abbreviation: GIFA
- Formation: 1900
- Type: NGO
- Purpose: Architectural profession
- Headquarters: Johannesburg, Gauteng
- Region served: Gauteng
- Website: www.gifa.org.za

The Gauteng Institute for Architecture (GIFA) is a professional membership organization for architects in Gauteng, South Africa. It promotes architecture and maintains standards within the profession, such as the registration of people in the industry under the Architectural Professions Act. This includes Architects, draughtsmen and architectural technologists. It organizes events, festivals and forums with architectural themes.

Its jurisdiction includes the cities of Pretoria, Johannesburg and Randburg which are some of the major cities in South Africa. It recently organized South Africa's first week-long architectural mega-event in Johannesburg in Sept, 2010, "AZA 2010", which is set to become Africa's premier urban culture festival. It included a debate entitled, "The state of housing in SA". Gifa also awards recognition to architects and their buildings every two years.

== Mission statement ==
GIfA is a progressive regional architectural institute, which together with its members and other built environment partners can unlock communities' access to a sustainable built environment. It recognizes the immeasurable potential of responsible architecture that unequivocally improves the quality of existence of being.

== History ==
Established in 1900, it was formerly the Transvaal Institute of Architects. They also published the Transvaal Institute of Architects Journal.

== Contemporary Presidents ==
- Khosto Moleko 1998-2000
- Hugh Fraser 2000–2004
- Kwasi Agyare-Dwomoh 2004-2006
- Motsepe Fanuel 2006-2008
- Clarence Kachipande 2008-2010
- Mphete Morojele 2010–2012
- Daniel Van Der Merwe 2012-2015
- Kumarsen Thamburan 2016-2018
- Nadia Tromp 2018-(2020) Current
