= Francis Skeat =

English stained glass artist (1909–2000)

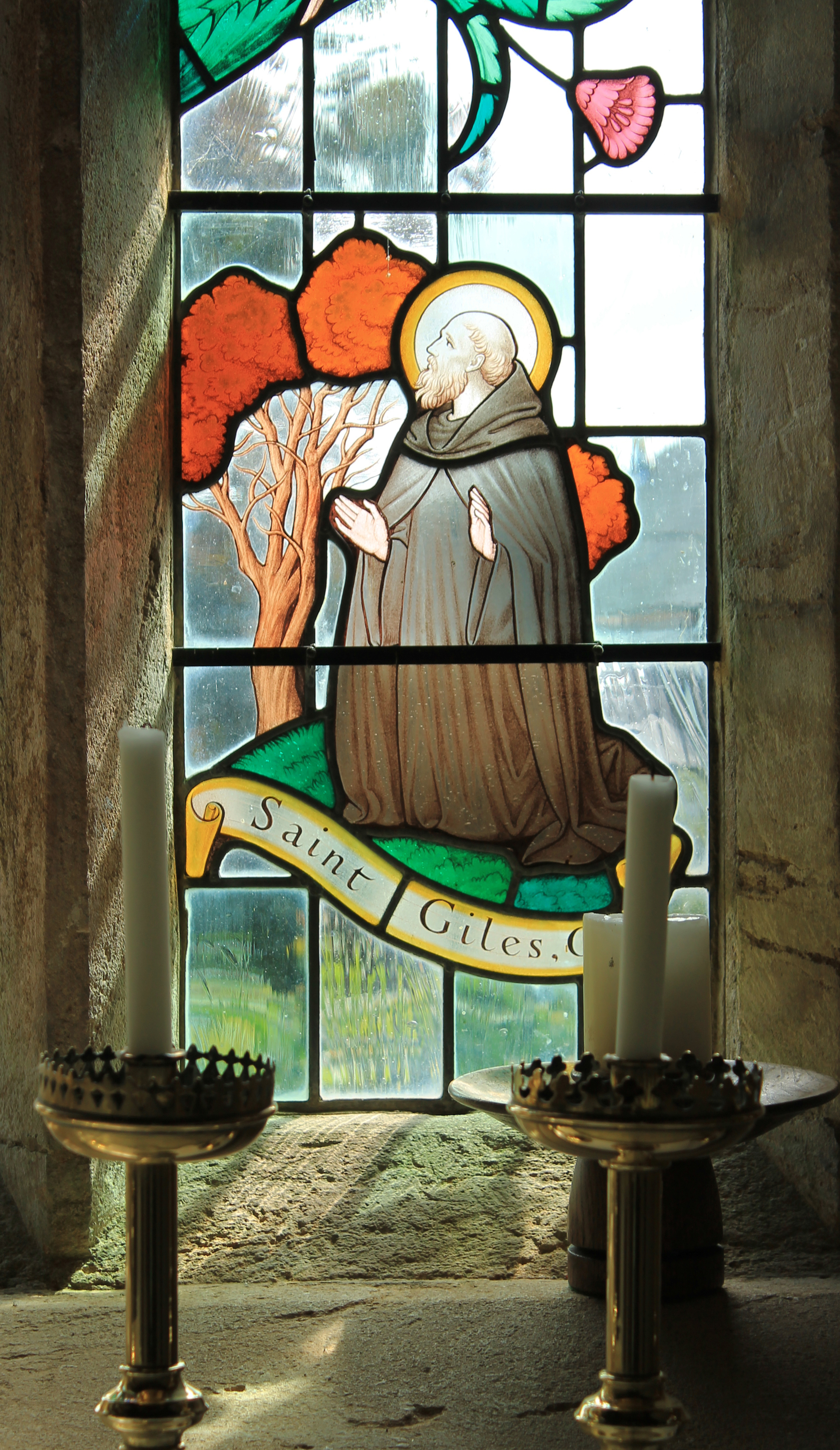
A detail of the East Window in the church of St Giles, Hooke, Dorset. By Francis Skeat (1963)

Francis Walter Skeat (3 December 1909 – 31 August 2000) was an English glass painter who created over 400 stained glass windows in churches and cathedrals, both in England and overseas. Skeat was a Fellow of the Royal Society of Arts, a Fellow of the British Society of Master Glass Painters, and a member of the Art Workers Guild.

== Education and career ==
Skeat was born in St Albans in Hertfordshire; his mother Theodora had an embroidery studio in Chester and his grandfather was Walter William Skeat, the etymologist. Skeat was educated at Lyndale School, St Albans and Whitgift School, Croydon. At the age of eighteen, he was apprenticed to Harry Scott Bridgwater who was a leading mezzotint engraver. He was a follower of Sir John Ninian Comper; after exhibiting at the Paris Salon in 1932, he returned to St Albans in 1933 and the following year he became a pupil of Christopher Webb, who had a studio in St Albans and encouraged him to work in stained glass. He later worked for A. R. Mowbray and Co. in Oxford and for J. Wippell and Co. of Exeter; he also designed glass for the firm of Barton, Kinder and Alderson.

In 1934 he presented two glass panels to the Church of St John in Old London Road, St Albans, where he was a parishioner. These panels, featuring the Good Shepherd and St John the Baptist, were his first church windows. In 1955 St John's was demolished and the panels were moved to St Peter's. In 1937 he married Birgit Ann Mari Lindquist from Gothenburg, Sweden, where he lived until the end of the Second World War. After the war, he opened his first studio at 7a Market Place, St Albans, before moving his studio to Cross Lane, Harpenden. His first major commission was for the largest window in the southern hemisphere, for the south transept of St George's Cathedral, Cape Town, South Africa. The rose window was installed in 1957, and was designed by Frank Spears.

== Style and mark ==
A sample of Skeat's marks

Skeat's mark as seen at Holy Trinity, Crockham Hill, Kent

Skeat's works employ crisply drawn figures on a largely clear glazed background, which was a popular formula in post-war stained glass. The panels he created for St John's church in St Albans bear his marks described as "a hart lodged at gaze in a small shield within a larger shield with walled top and alternate horizontal sections" and a "scrolled shield with a hart statant". The hart is taken from the Arms of the county of Hertfordshire. The lines across the shield are an allusion to a ford, a pun on the county's name. His mark later became a rebus, St Francis of Assisi, around whom radiate small flying birds, together with his initials.

== Works ==
Among Skeat's works is the memorial to the footballer, Duncan Edwards, who played for Manchester United and England. He was one of eight players who was killed in the Munich air disaster in February 1958; Edwards was only 21 at the time of his death. On 27 August 1961 a stained-glass window depicting the player, designed by Skeat, was unveiled in St Francis's Church, the parish church for the Priory Estate, Dudley, by Matt Busby, Edwards's former manager.

In the City of London church of St Sepulchre-without-Newgate there is a memorial window to John Smith, the governor of Virginia and associate of Pocahontas who was buried there in 1631. The window was designed by Skeat and given to the church by Bradford Smith in 1968. Captain John Smith is shown in the central panel of the window with his navigational instruments at his feet.

The east window in the Lady Chapel of St Andrew's Church, Swavesey in Cambridgeshire, contains a 1967 Tree of Jesse by Francis Skeat. In a letter to the incumbent and the churchwardens, Skeat writes:-

"The window scheme of my design is intended to symbolise the descent of Our Lord from Abraham and the patriarchs as detailed in the opening chapter of St Matthew's Gospel. It is not merely a Jesse Tree since it goes back before his time..........."

Jesse appears in the right hand light and is in a standing position facing left. The figures in the window are:- first light, Boaz; second light, Ruth and above her Jacob; middle light, Abraham and Isaac; above them, the Blessed Virgin Mary and Child; at the top, Asa; fourth light, David with Solomon above him; fifth light, Jesse. The text at the bottom of the window, taken from the 1662 Book of Common Prayer version of Nicene Creed, reads:-

Who for us men, and for our salvation came down from heaven, and was incarnate by the Holy Ghost of the Virgin Mary, and was made man.

== Publications ==
In May 1977, Skeat published "Stained Glass of St Albans Cathedral". Other works to which he has contributed include:

- The Stained Glass Work of János Hajnal: Vol. XV No. 3 (British Society: London, 1974–75)
- A Survey of Stained Glass in Museums: Vol. XVII, No. 2 (British Society: London, 1978–79)
- A Survey of Stained Glass in Museums and Art Galleries (Part Two): Vol. XVI, No. 3 (British Society: London, 1979–80)
- The Vanished Glass of Exeter Cathedral
