= Rowan Smith =

South African Anglican priest (1943-2018)

Rowan Quentin Smith (8 August 1943 – 23 May 2018) was a Dean of St. George's Cathedral, Cape Town.

== Early life and education ==
Rowan Smith was born on 8 August 1943, the son of Frank and Dorothea Smith. Under the prevailing race laws of the Apartheid regime in South Africa, he was accorded the status of a Coloured person. He was educated at Kensington High School, Cape Town (class of 1960), King’s College, London (Associate, 1966); and at St Boniface Missionary College, Warminster (1966-1967).

== Career ==
He was ordained deacon at St. Nicholas’ Church, Matroosfontein, on 4 June 1967 by the Right Reverend Philip Welsford Richmond Russell, Bishop Suffragan of Cape Town, and priest at St. George's Cathedral, Cape Town on 9 June 1968 by the Archbishop of Cape Town, the Most Reverend Robert Selby Taylor.

He served successively as assistant curate (licensed 4 June 1967) and assistant priest (licensed 9 June 1968; served until 1971) of St. Nicholas’, Matroosfontein; assistant curate of All Saints’, Plumstead (licensed 10 January 1971; served until 1972); and priest-in-charge of Grassy Park (licensed 16 April 1972; served until May 1977), all in the Diocese of Cape Town.

Thereafter, he entered the novitiate of the Community of the Resurrection, Mirfield, in June 1977. He became a professed member of the community in 1980 and was then appointed as chaplain to St. Martin’s School, in the city and diocese of Johannesburg.

Released from his vows, he left the Community of the Resurrection in 1987, becoming Anglican chaplain at the University of Cape Town (1988-1989); and examining (1989-1990), and domestic (1990-1991) chaplain to the archbishop, the Most Reverend Desmond Mpilo Tutu, all in the Diocese of Cape Town.

Between 1991-1996 he served as provincial executive officer of the Church of the Province of Southern Africa. In 1996 he was appointed canon pastor (1996) and fourteenth dean and rector of the Cathedral Church of St. George the Martyr (installed by the archbishop, the Most Reverend Winston Hugh Njongonkulu Ndungane, 13 October 1996), all in the Diocese of Cape Town.

He came out as gay while serving as the dean of the cathedral, and was supported in this by his congregation.

== Retirement ==
He retired in 2010, being given the title of Canon.

== Personal life ==
Rowan Smith died at his home in Goodwood, Cape Town on 23 May 2018. He was unmarried.

== Notes ==
Anglican Church of Southern Africa titles
Preceded by Colin Jones	Dean of Cape Town; 1996–2010	Succeeded by Michael Weeder
