= Michael Weeder =

Michael Weeder is the current Dean of St. George's Cathedral, Cape Town.

== Notes ==
Anglican Church of Southern Africa titles
Preceded by Rowan Smith	Dean of Cape Town; 2011–	Incumbent
