= Helen King (oncologist) =

South African physician

Helen S. King
- Died: 2015
- Occupation: Oncologist
- Spouse: Edward King

Dr Helen S. King was a South African oncologist and anti-apartheid campaigner. She was married to Edward King, former Dean of Cape Town. She was awarded the Order of Simon of Cyrene in 1996.

King died in 2015.

== Selected works ==
King co-authored a number of papers in the field of radiotherapy including:

- Jacobs, Peter; King, Helen S.; Dent, David M.; Hayes, Malcolm (1985). "VP-16-213 in the treatment of stage III and IV diffuse large cell lymphoma". Cancer. 56 (5): 1006–1013. doi:10.1002/1097-0142(19850901)56:5<1006::AID-CNCR2820560505>3.0.CO;2-7. ISSN 0008-543X. PMID 3893681.
- Krige, J. E. J.; Isaacs, S.; Hudson, D. A.; King, Helen S.; Strover, R. M.; Johnson, Carol A. (1991). "Delay in the diagnosis of cutaneous malignant melanoma. A prospective study in 250 patients". Cancer. 68 (9): 2064–2068. doi:10.1002/1097-0142(19911101)68:9<2064::AID-CNCR2820680937>3.0.CO;2-3. ISSN 0008-543X. PMID 1913555.
- Jacobs, Peter; Stuart Rutherford, G.; King, Helen S.; Vincent, Mark (1991). "Methotrexate encephalopathy". European Journal of Cancer and Clinical Oncology. 27 (8): 1061–1062. doi:10.1016/0277-5379(91)90285-L. ISSN 0277-5379. PMID 1832896.
