= Edward King (priest) =

British priest (1920–1998)

Edward Laurie King was an eminent Anglican clergyman in the 20th century.

He was born on 30 January 1920, educated at the University College of South Wales and St. Michael's College, Llandaff and ordained in 1946. After curacies in Risca and St Boniface Church Germiston he was rector of Robertson, Western Cape and then Stellenbosch. In 1958 he became Dean of Cape Town, a post he held for 30 years.

He had five children, Bridget, Catherine, Gregory, Philip and Margret. He was married to Dr Helen King until his death, on 4 August 1998.

== Notes ==
Anglican Church of Southern Africa titles
Preceded by Tom Savage	Dean of Cape Town; 1958 – 1988	Succeeded by Colin Jones
