= Colin Jones (priest) =

South African clergyman

Colin Jones was Dean of St. George's Cathedral, Cape Town from 1988 to 1995.

== Notes ==
Anglican Church of Southern Africa titles
Preceded by Edward Laurie King	Dean of Cape Town; 1988 – 1995	Succeeded by Rowan Quentin Smith
