= St Richard of Chichester Church, Chichester =

Coordinates: 50.8329°N 0.7770°W

St Richard's Church
- St Richard of Chichester Church
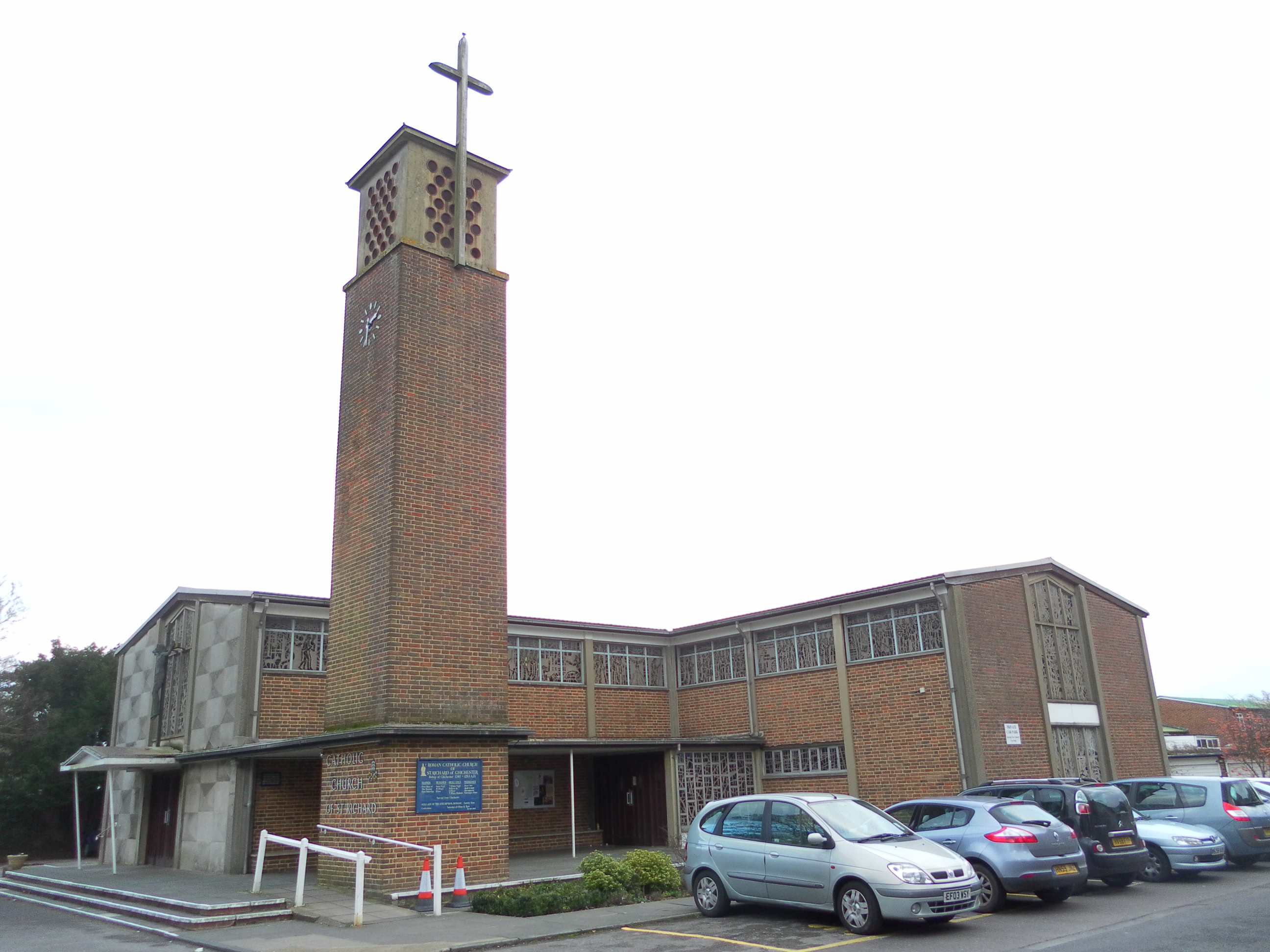

- Location in Chichester
- Location: Chichester, West Sussex
- Country: England
- Denomination: Roman Catholic
- Website: [ https://www.saintsofsussex.com ]

History
- Status: Active
- Dedication: Richard of Chichester
- Consecrated: 21 March 1998

Architecture
- Functional status: Parish church
- Heritage designation: Grade II listed
- Designated: 13 November 2007
- Architect(s): Tomei & Maxwell
- Completed: 19 March 1958

Administration
- Province: Southwark
- Diocese: Arundel and Brighton
- Deanery: Cathedral

St Richard of Chichester Church is a Roman Catholic parish church in Chichester, West Sussex, England. The church was built in 1958 and contains the largest scheme of stained glass by Gabriel Loire in the United Kingdom. The church is situated on Market Avenue on the corner of Cawley Road, next to St Richard's Catholic Primary School. It is a Grade II listed building.

== History ==
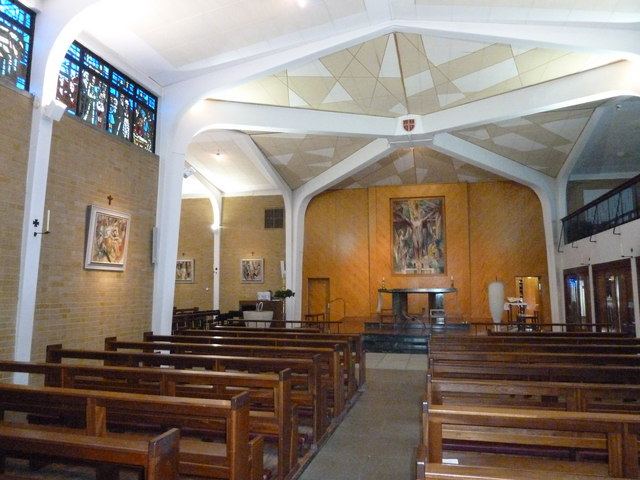
Interior

=== First church ===
Before 1855, Mass was said in a room in the Bedford Hotel on Southgate in Chichester. Funding for a new, permanent church was provided by the Countess of Newburgh. In 1855, a Gothic Revival church was built on the corner of Market Avenue and Southgate; it remained until 1958.

=== Present church ===
On 19 March 1958, the present church was opened. It replaced the church on Market Avenue and Southgate. The architects were Lawrence Tomei (1910–1989) and John Maxwell. They also designed All Saints Church in Hersham. The builders were A. Booker and Son from Walberton.

Inside the church is a continuous clerestory around the nave and transepts. The stained glass window scheme in the church was made by Gabriel Loire using the dalle de verre style in a complete figurative narrative design. The Stations of the Cross that are oil paintings, the altarpiece, baptistry and the six angels in the Blessed Sacrament chapel were all designed by David O’Connell (1895–1976).

== Parish ==
The priests at St Richard of Chichester Church also serve Our Lady of the Assumption Church on Fairfield Road in Bosham, Our Lady of Mount Carmel and St Wilfrid's Church on Church Road in Selsey, and St Peter's Church on Church Road in East Wittering and as of 1 November 2021 they form a single parish: the Parish of Our Lady and the Saints of Sussex.

St Richard of Chichester Church has three Sunday Masses at 6:00 pm on Saturday, and 9:30 am and 6:30 pm on Sunday. Our Lady of the Assumption Church in Bosham has one Sunday Mass at 11:30 am and St Peter's Church in East Wittering has one Sunday Mass at 9:00 am. Our Lady of Mount Carmel and St Wilfrid's Church in Selsey has one Mass on Sunday at 11am.

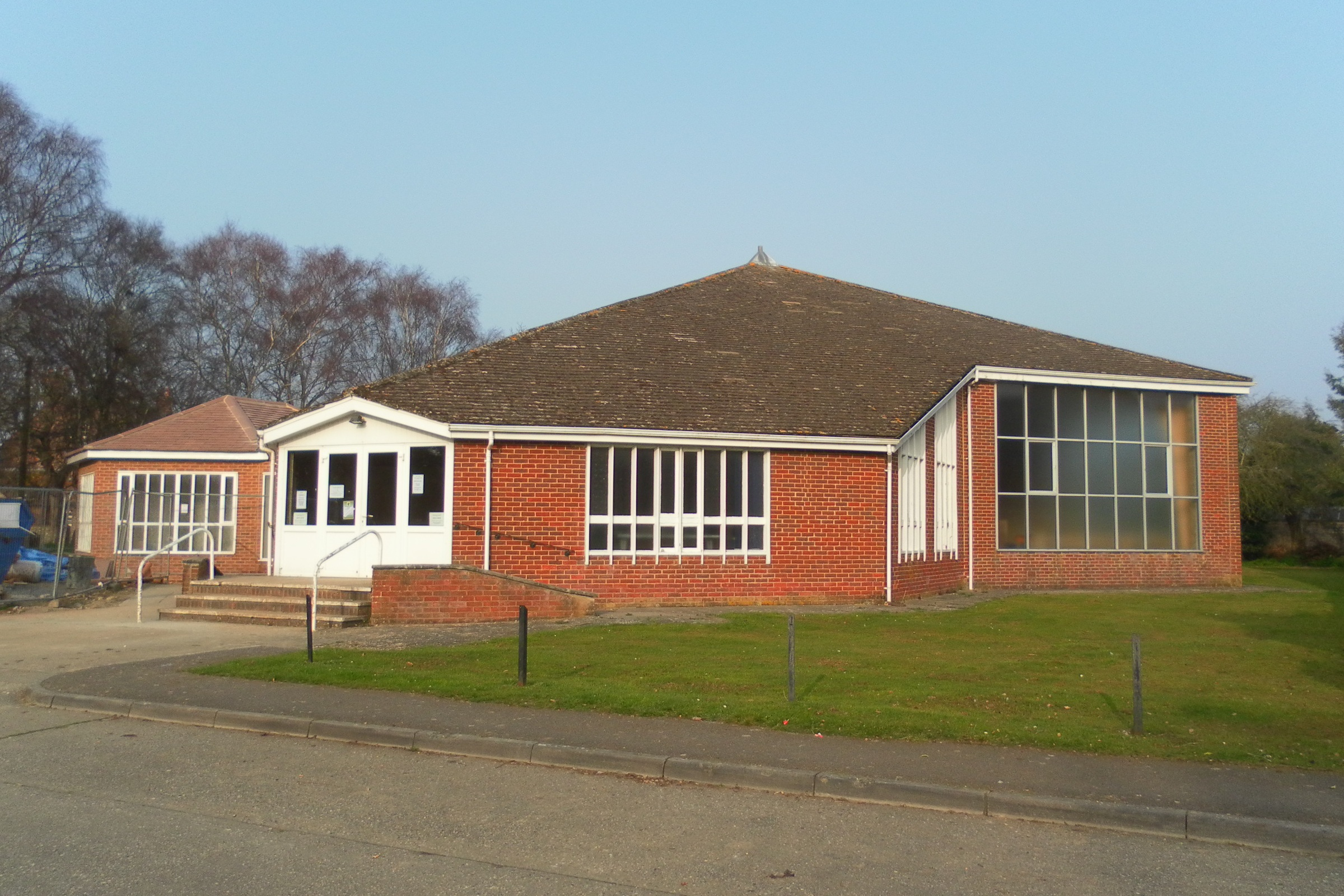
Our Lady of the Assumption Church, Bosham

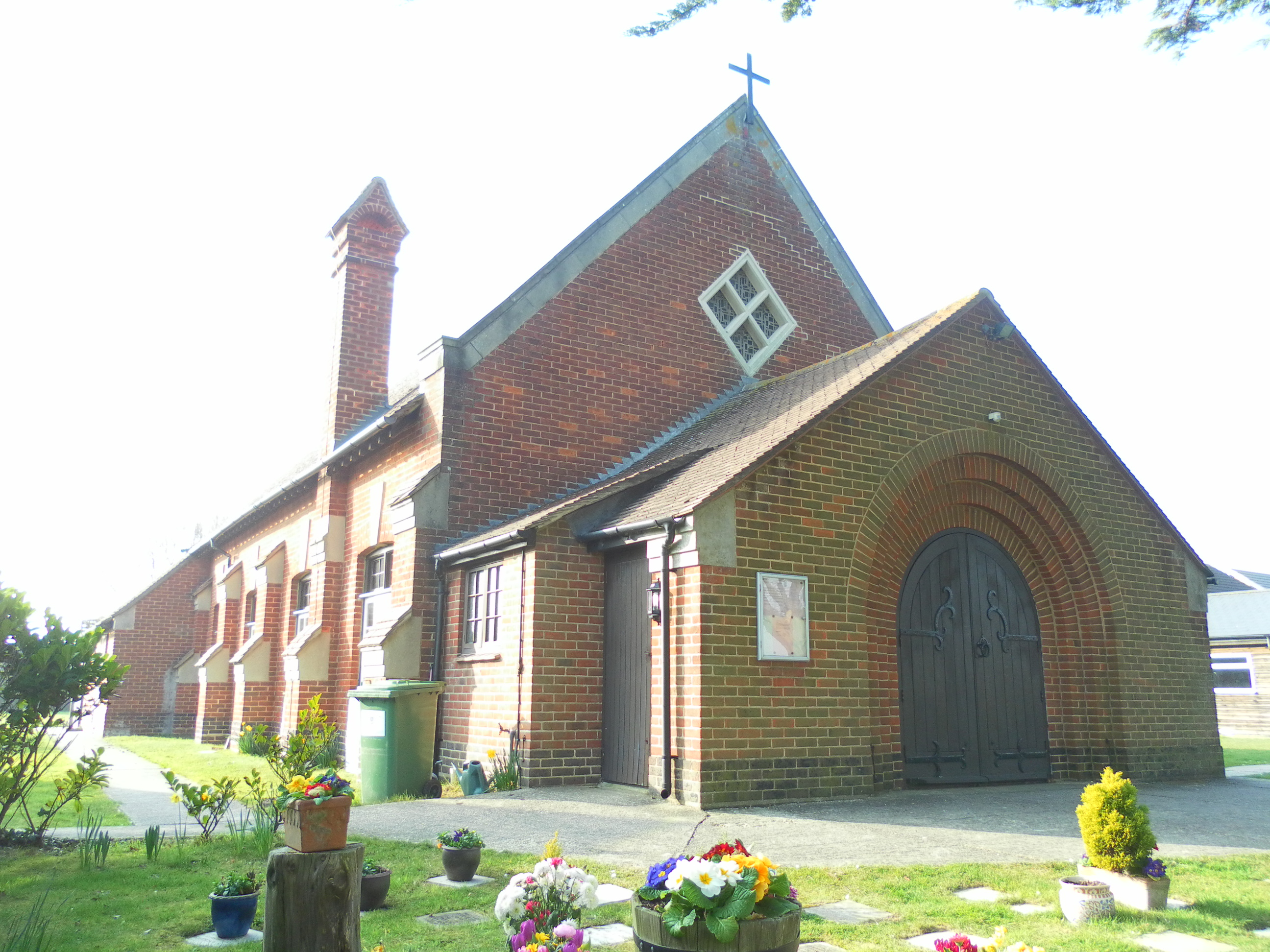
St Peter's Church, East Wittering

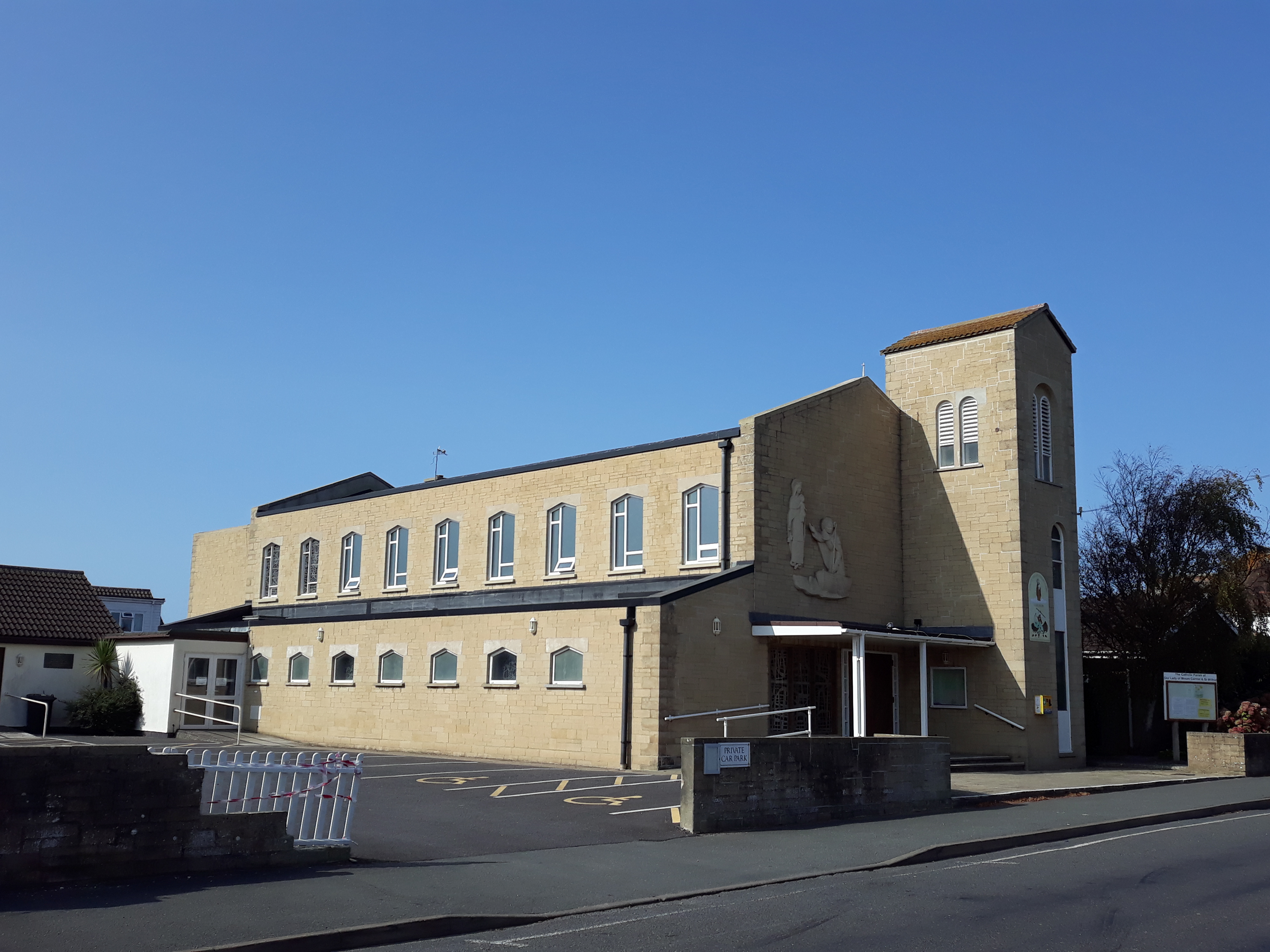
Our Lady of Mount Carmel and St Wilfrid's Church, Selsey

== See also ==
- List of current places of worship in Chichester District
- Roman Catholic Diocese of Arundel and Brighton
