= Gabriel Loire =

French painter

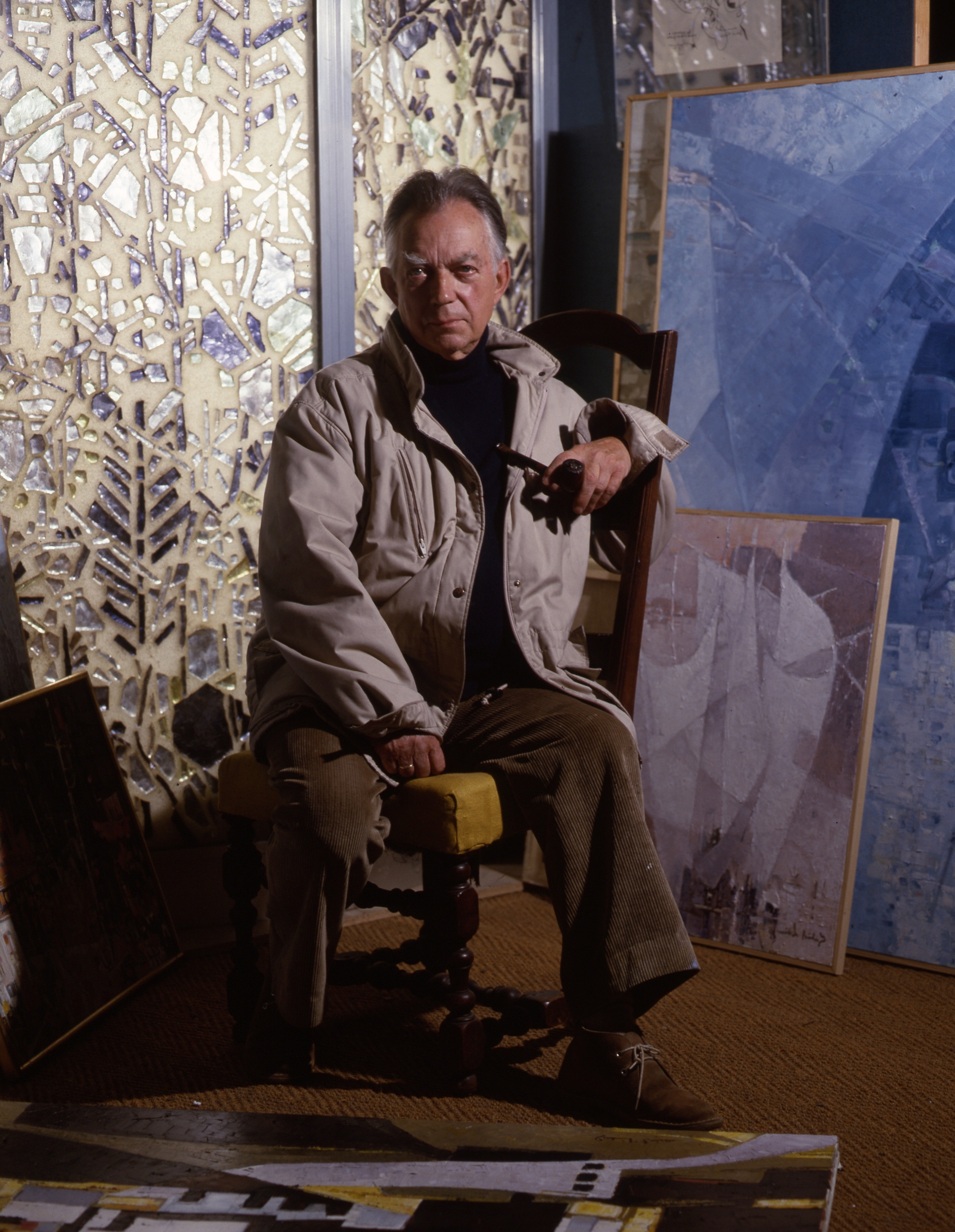
- Born: April 21, 1904; Pouancé, France
- Died: December 27, 1996 (aged 92)
- Known for: dalle de verre
- Notable work: Kaiser Wilhelm Memorial Church; Saint Paul's Church, Whiteinch, Glasgow
- Style: stained glass
- Website: https://ateliers-loire.fr

Gabriel Loire (April 21, 1904 – December 25, 1996) was a French stained glass artist of the twentieth century whose extensive works, portraying various persons or historical scenes, appear in many venues around the world. He founded the Loire Studio in Chartres, France which continues to produce stained glass windows. Loire was a leader in the modern use of "slab glass" (French: dalle de verre), which is much thicker and stronger than the stained glass technique of the Middle Ages. The figures in his windows are mostly Impressionistic in style.

== Life ==
Loire was born in Pouancé, France, on April 21, 1904. After completing his schooling in Angers in 1926, he went to Charles Lorin stained glass workshop in Chartres, France; where he worked for 10 years, until leaving in 1936. In order to leave, Loire was required to sign a non-compete agreement stating that he would not design any stained glass for 10 years. In 1946, he founded his own stained glass studio there, which continues under the direction of his son Jacques Loire and grandsons.

He died on Christmas Day, December 25, 1996, shortly after finishing a design for a new window.

== Commissions ==
Loire often expressed the view, "La paix donne la joie" ("Peace gives joy") and particularly liked working with shades of blue, which he said represented to him the colour of peace. His stained glass artistry, blending modern and traditional elements, attained wide acceptance, as indicated by the considerable output of the Loire Studio displayed around the world. In addition to more than 450 installations in France, Loire's works are found in Scotland, Germany, Ireland, South Africa, Morocco, Japan, Chile, Canada, Australia and the United States of America.

=== Post-war work ===
Some of his important commissions were for churches rebuilt after destruction in World War II, in particular the Kaiser Wilhelm Memorial Church (Kaiser-Wilhelm-Gedächtniskirche) in Berlin, Germany (1960) and the Church of St. Walberge, Xertigny, Lorraine, France (1951–1952).

His greatest post-war work is in Saint Paul's Church, Whiteinch, Glasgow (1960). It consists of 162 Square metres of curved window set in cement and embedded with chipped glass. The main panels depict the life of Saint Paul and are ably supported in the side altar by panels of the Virgin and the roof of the Baptismal font. The church building is Category B listed.

The Holy Name Church, Oakley, Fife, (1958), notable features include the stained glass windows and the carved Stations of the Cross are also by Gabriel Loire.

Our Lady of Mount Carmel RC Church, Kilmarnock, Ayrshire (1963). Large window above main entrance, also designed the windows in the octagonal baptistry.

St John's RC Church, Stevenston, Ayrshire, windows depicting biblical scenes, (1963).

He has other works in the Church of Our Lady of Perpetual Succour, Broomhill, Glasgow (1965). Though the technique here is not of chipped glass but more of painted glass.

=== Saint Angela Merici Catholic Church in Pacific Grove, California ===
Gabriel Loire was commissioned to create seventeen windows for a new brick church building, constructed in 1957. The new Church was designed to combine an accessible, modern liturgical environment with minimalism that was part of midcentury architecture. At the front, above the main doors of the church is triptych window which depicts the ministry, crucifixion, and ascension of Jesus. Along the right side of the nave are seven windows depicting: Saint Pius X; Saint Patrick; Our Lady of Fatima; Saint Anthony of Padua; the Virgin Mary; Saint Joseph and the Child Jesus; and Saint Therese, Child of Jesus. Along the left side of the nave are seven windows depicting: Saint Angela Merici at evening prayer with family; Saint Angela Merici praying before the Assumption of Mary; Saint Angela Merici's vision of ten virgins; the Healing of Saint Angela Merici; Saint Angela Merici founding the Ursuline Order; Saint Dominic; and Saint Ignatius of Loyola.

=== Episcopal Church of the Good Samaritan ===
In 1963, the Episcopal Church of the Good Samaritan in Corvallis, Oregon, commissioned Loire to design stained glass chapel windows that expressed the congregation's dedication to the ministry of healing, funded in part by contributions from physicians in the parish. In 1968, the church contracted 49 additional windows for the main sanctuary representing "The Revelation of Truth from God through Human Personality."

=== St. Andrew's-Wesley United Church ===
For St. Andrew's-Wesley United Church in Vancouver, Canada, Loire created three different commissions: in 1969, a set of six windows dedicated to women in the Bible; also in 1969, "The Great Commission", based on Mark 16:15 "Go ye into all the world"; and in 1981, a set of eight windows based on Romans 9:4–5.

=== Whatley Chapel ===
Other notable works include Loire's stained glass windows designed in 1962 for Whatley Chapel at Johnson & Wales University in Denver, CO, and in 1980 for Salisbury Cathedral in England, as well as in 1967 for Grace Cathedral, San Francisco. In 1958 he provided an extensive and "remarkable" scheme of dalle de verre glass for St Richard of Chichester Roman Catholic Church in Chichester, West Sussex.

=== St Augustine's Chapel ===
Two large and striking windows were completed for St Augustine's Chapel in Cork, Ireland in about 1972. These windows measure 12.5 metres in height and about 2 metres wide; the glass is solid coloured, not stained, glass. This glass is approximately 26 millimetres thick and is described as "dalle-de-verre", flagstones of glass, set in concrete and forming an integral load-bearing part of the building. Please see thumbnails.

=== Thanks-Giving Square ===
In 1976 Loire completed the "Glory Window" for Thanks-Giving Square in Dallas, Texas. The window, which contains 73 panels of faceted glass, covers the spiral ceiling of non-denominational chapel to create one of the largest horizontally mounted stained glass windows in the world. Lower panels feature varying shades of blue. As the spiral continues inwards and upwards the colors become warmer and brighter until reaching the center where 60 feet above the floor the panels give way to a circle of beaming yellow light. Taking its name from Psalm 19, Loire meant this progression "to express life with its difficulties, its forces, its joys, its torments, and its frightening aspects. Bit by bit, all of that gives way to an explosion of gold where the summit is reached." An image of the "Glory Window" was chosen for the official United Nations stamp in 2000 during the International Year of Thanksgiving. It was also featured in the 2011 Oscar-nominated film The Tree of Life.

=== St. George's Cathedral ===
His celebrated Christ in Triumph over Darkness and Evil was dedicated in 1982 at St. George's Cathedral in Cape Town, South Africa, in memory of British war hero Earl Mountbatten of Burma, the last Viceroy of India.

=== Christ Church in Hamilton, Massachusetts ===
Gabriel Loire created a suite of magnificent windows for Christ Church (Episcopal) in Hamilton, Massachusetts.

=== First Baptist Church, Everett, Washington ===
66 windows were commissioned between 1959-1961 and include:

- East side: 38 stained glass windows in abstract composition and attributes
- West side: 15 stained glass windows in abstract composition and attributes
- North side: 13 stained glass windows on the theme of fire.
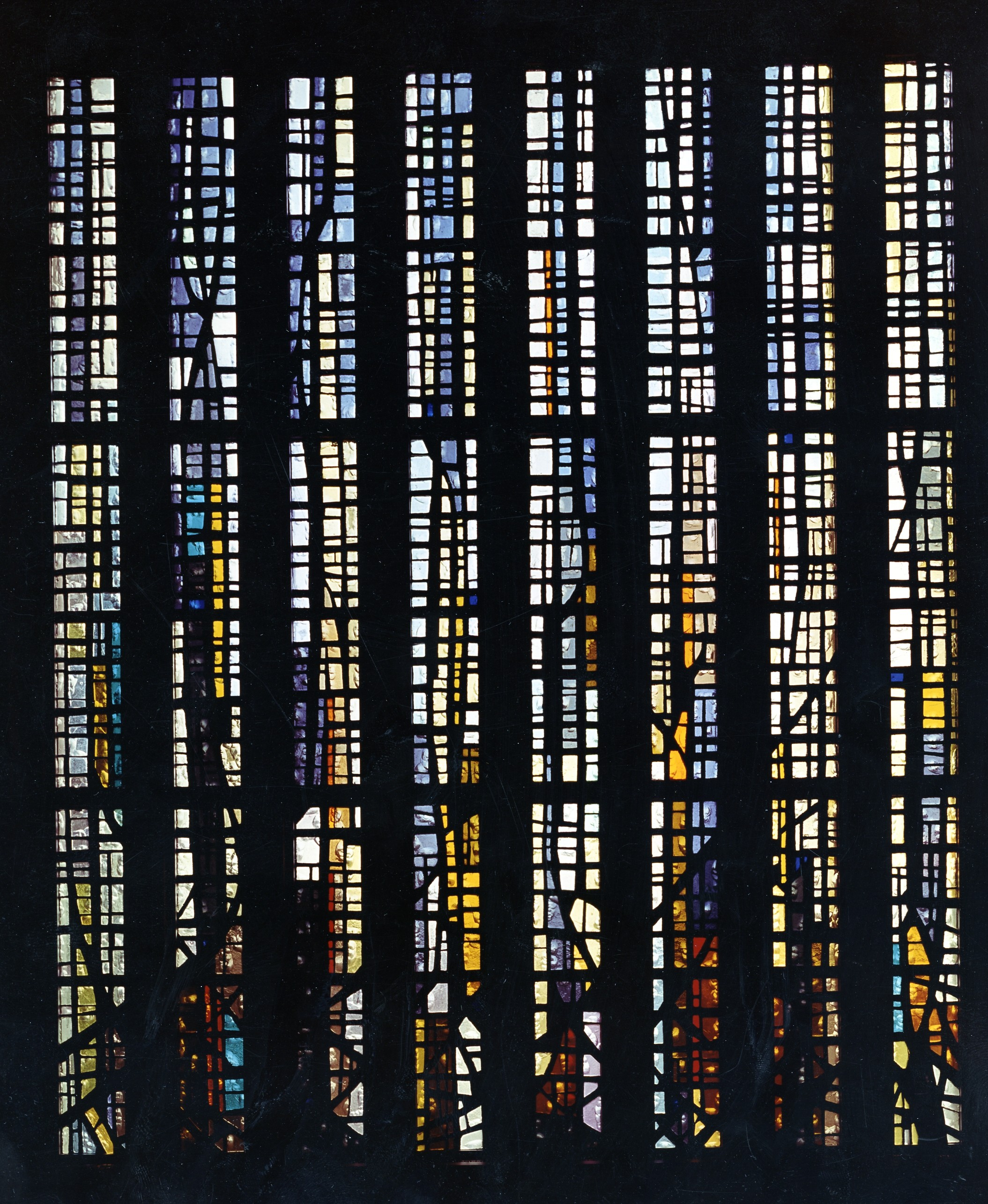
Closeup of Window in Main Sanctuary

=== First United Methodist Church, Alexandria, Louisiana ===
The four windows on the left of the nave at First United Methodist Church in Alexandria, Louisiana, designed by Loire depict scenes from the life of Christ: The Baptism, The Temptation, The Ministry, and his Crucifixion. The triangular west window by Loire is entitled Cycle of Celebration and depicts the Christian community ascending the "holy hill of the Lord", based on Psalm 43.

Crowell Chapel - The window which lights the mosaic is also by Loire and illustrates the theme of Christian service, using the parable of the Good Samaritan.

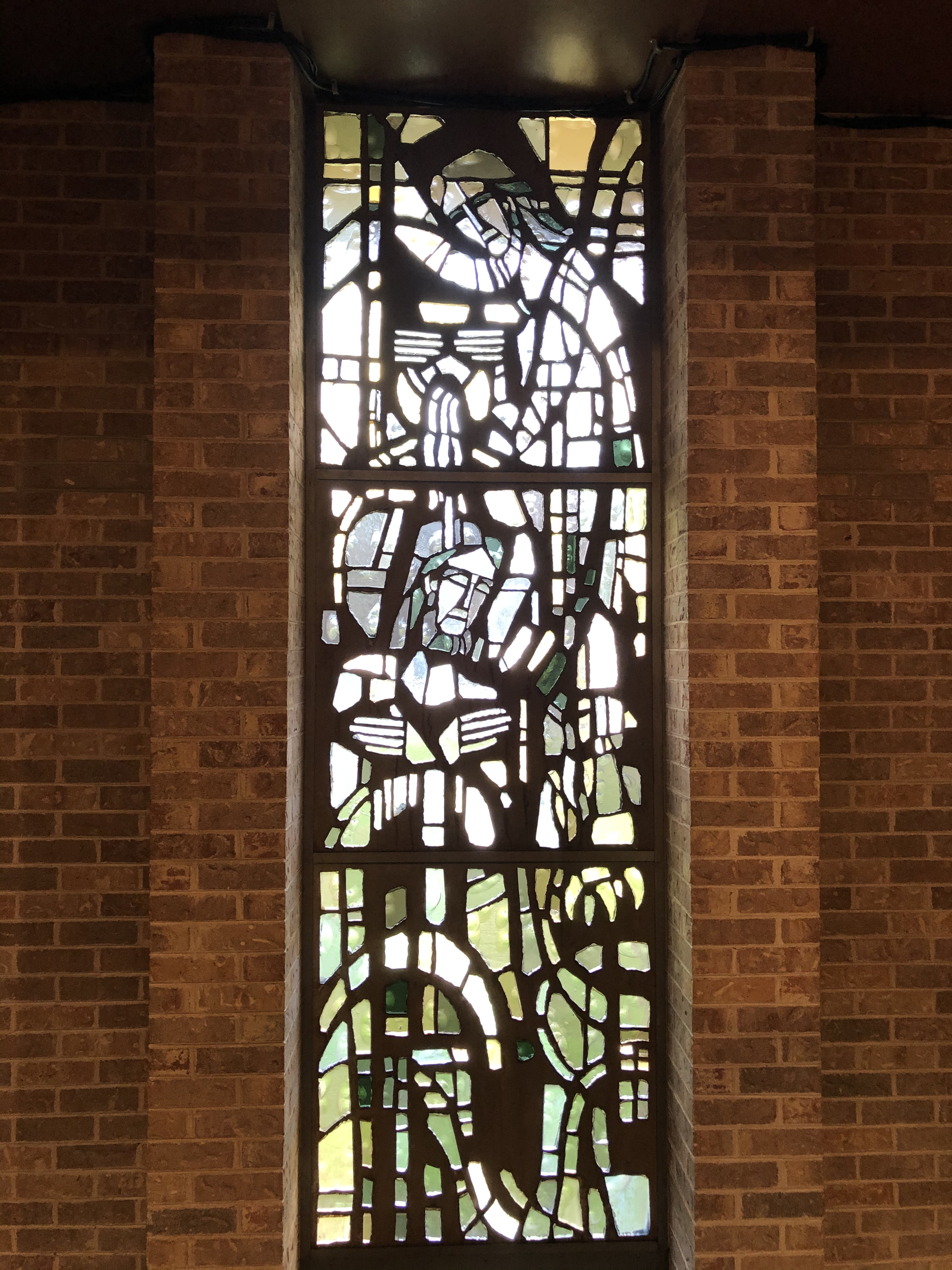
The Baptism of Christ

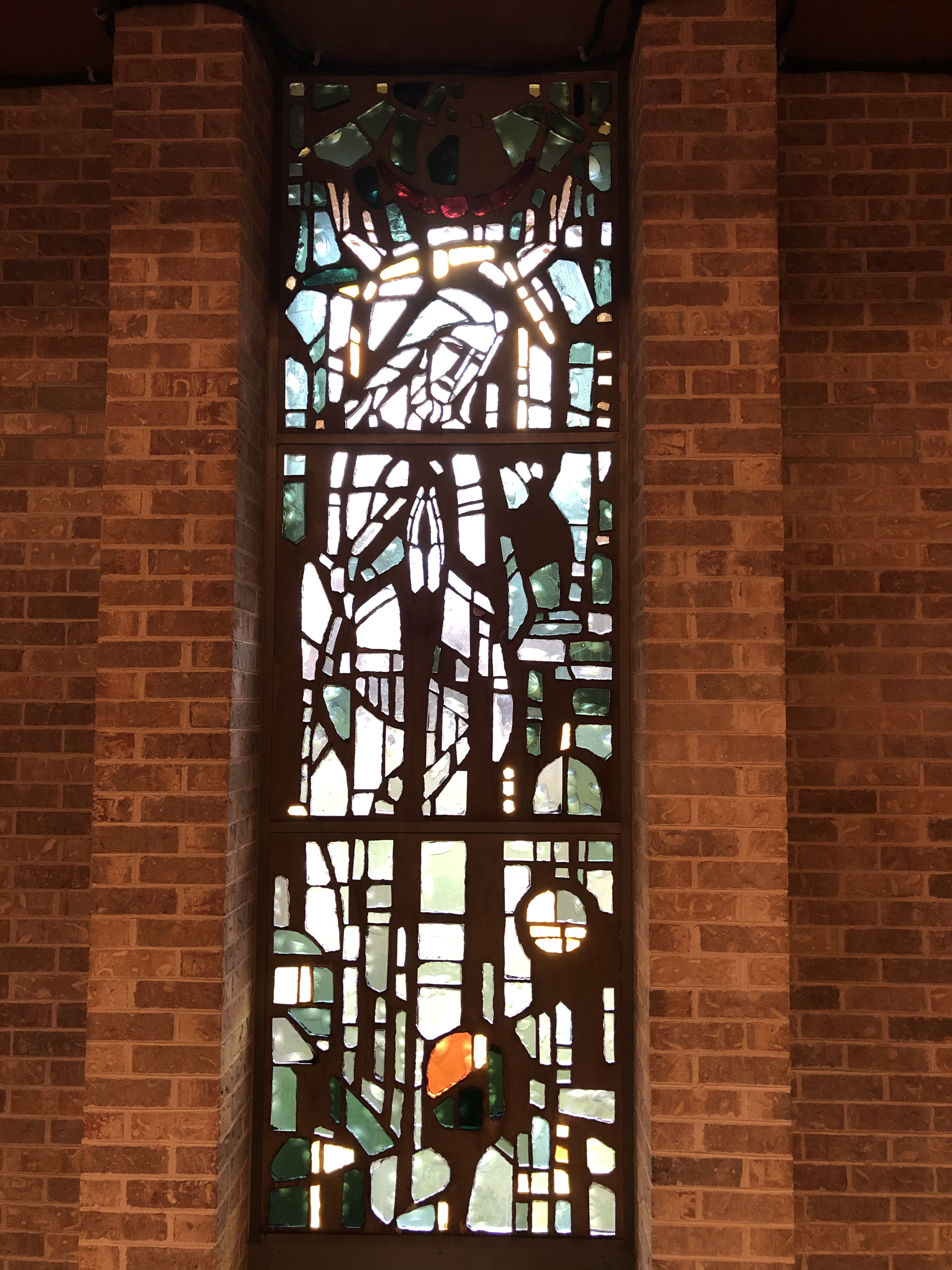
The Temptation

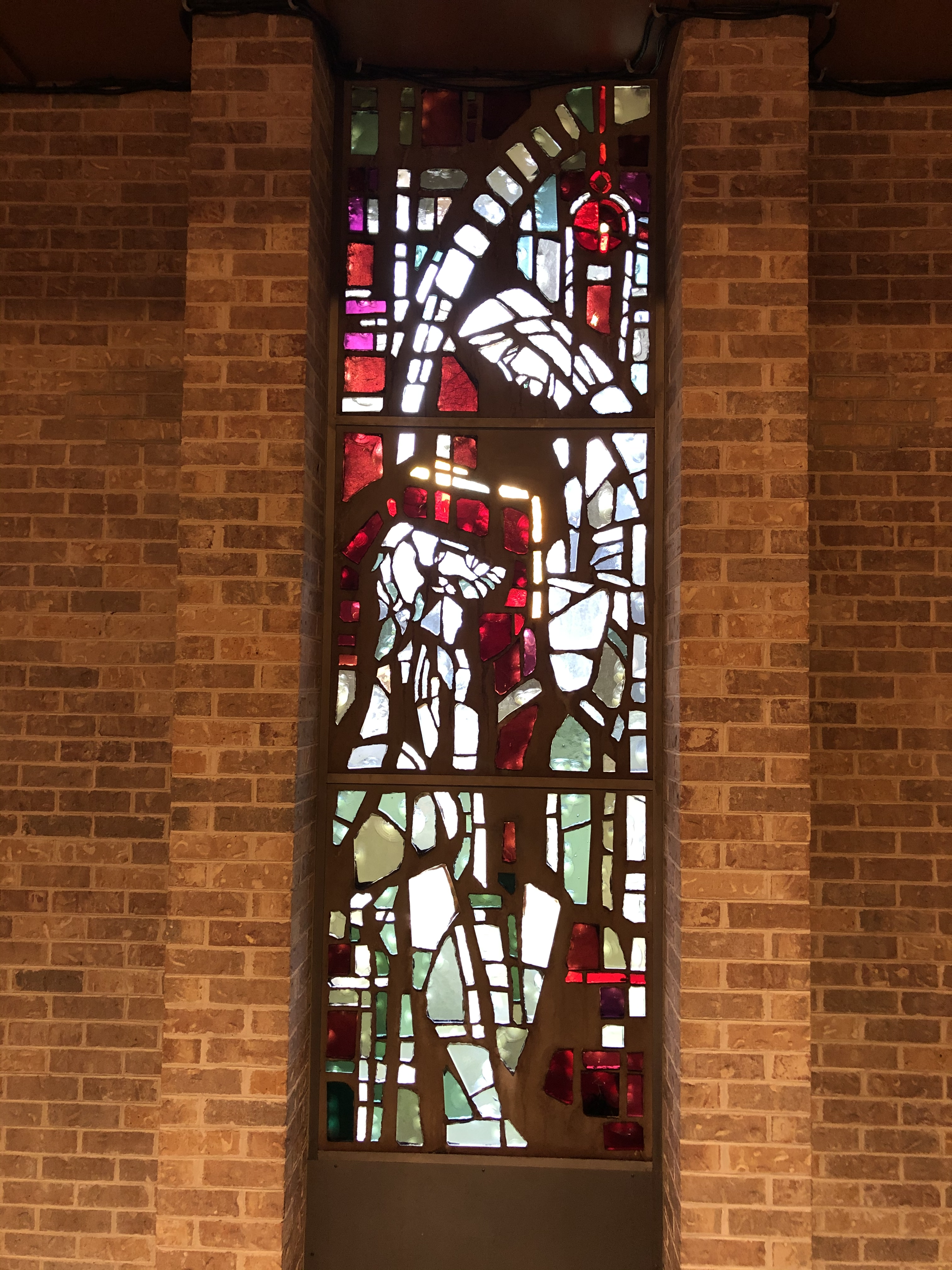
Christ in ministry to others

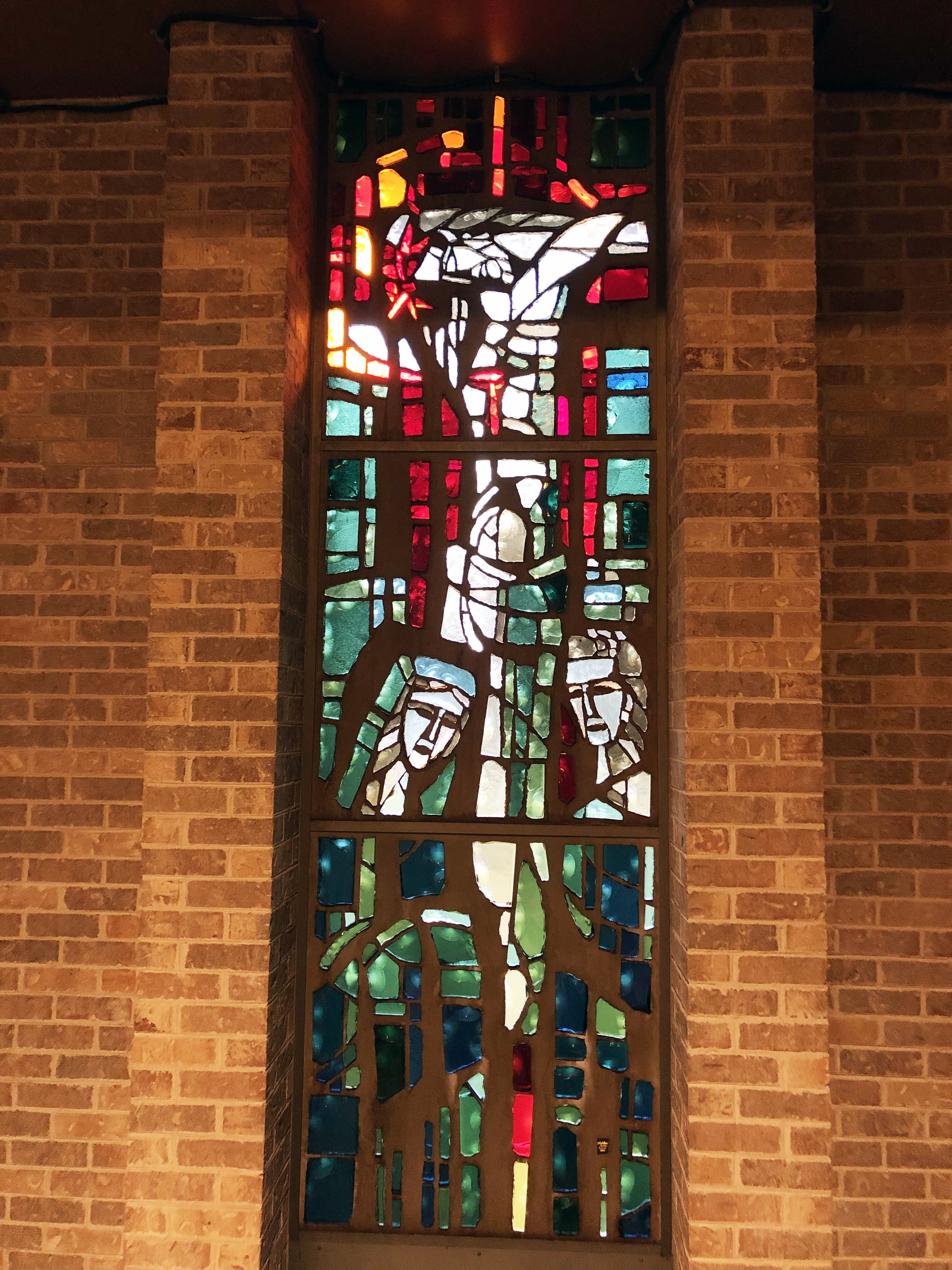
The Crucifixion of Christ

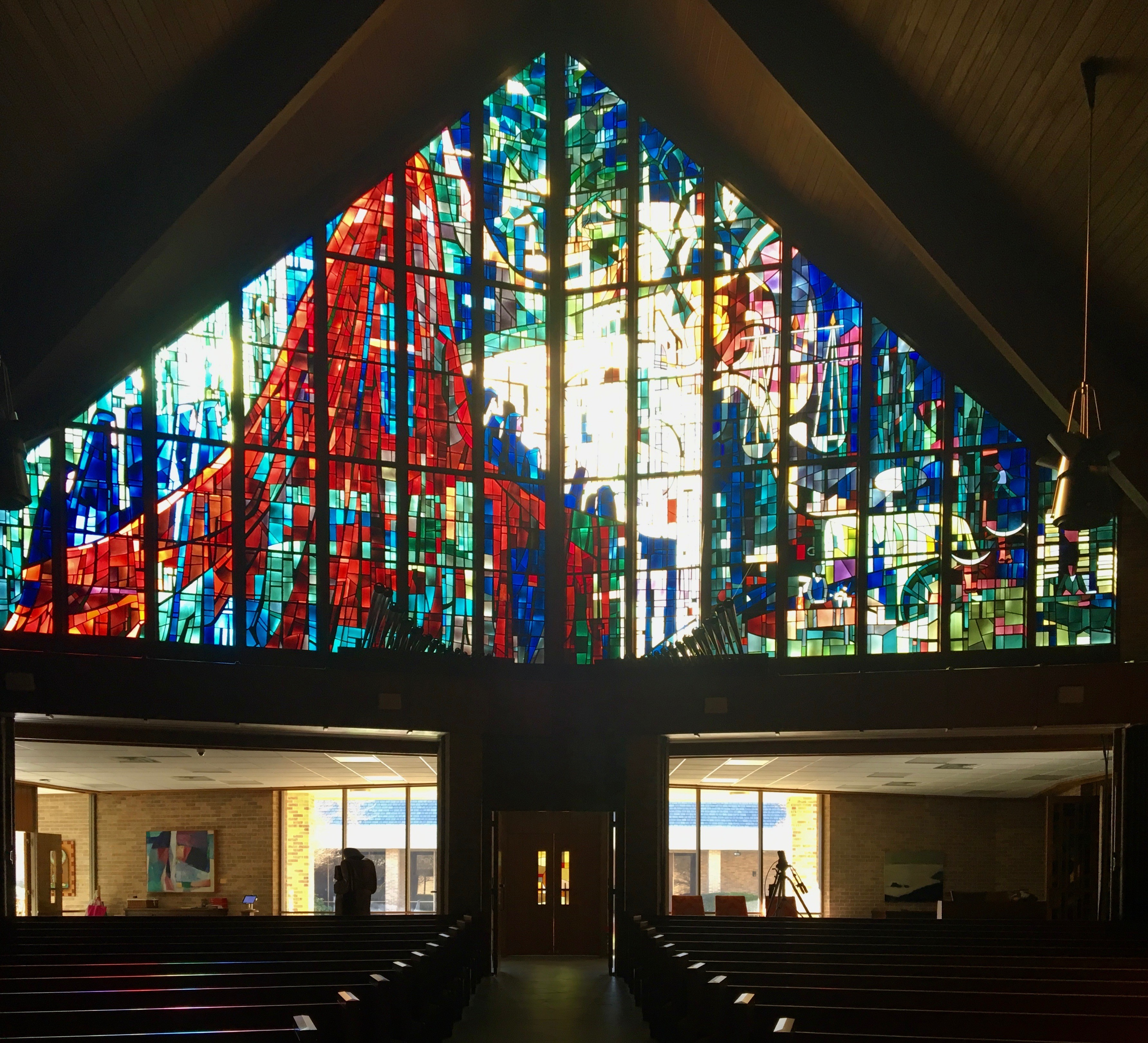
West Window

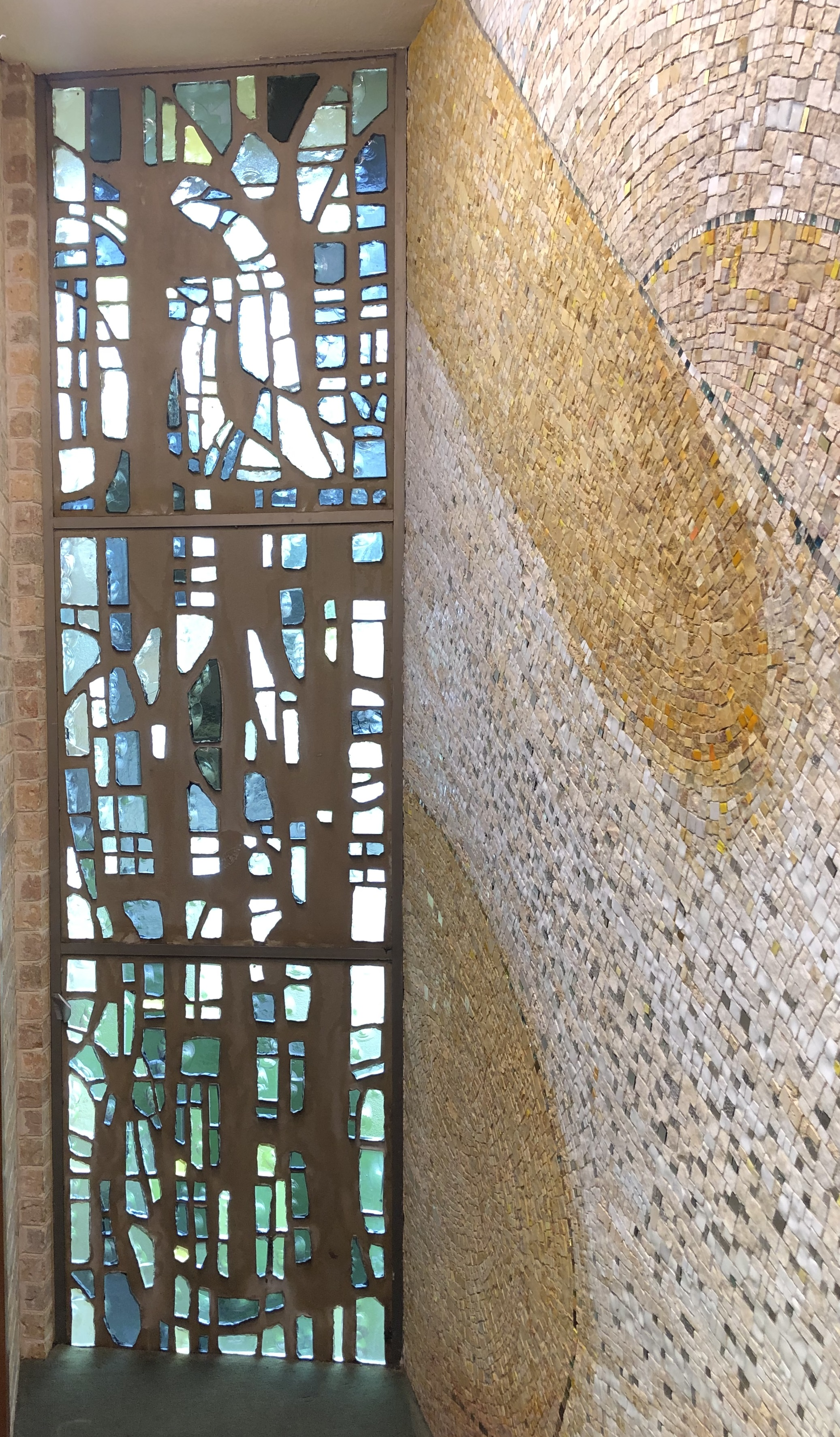
The parable of the Good Samaritan

== Gallery of Gabriel Loire's works ==
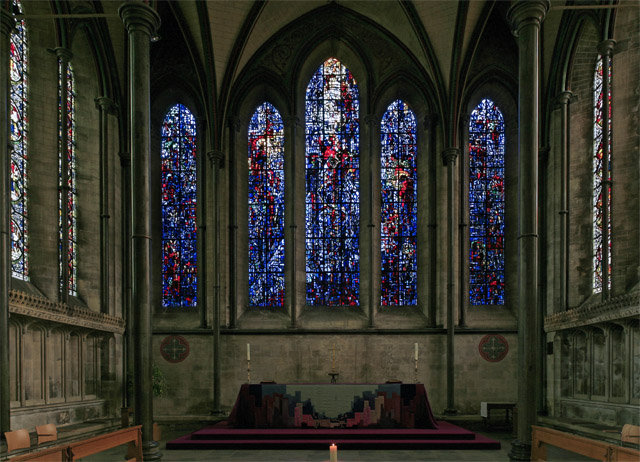
Prisoners of conscience window in the Trinity Chapel of Salisbury Cathedral, UK (1980)

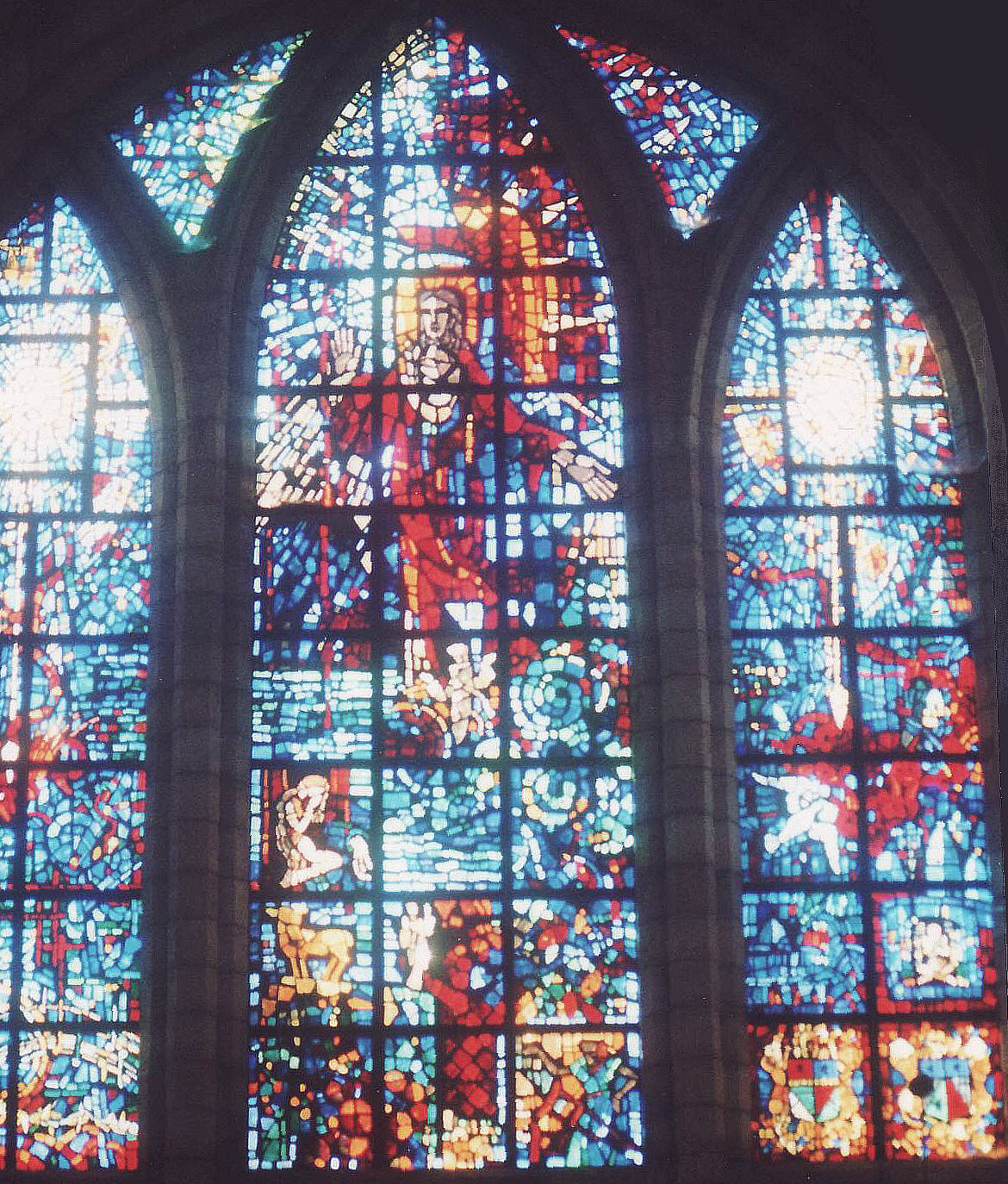
Christ in Triumph over Darkness and Evil, St. George's Cathedral, Cape Town, South Africa (1982)
