= Frank Sydney Spears =

South African painter (1906–1991)

- Born: 4 August 1906; Walsall, West Midlands, Englands
- Died: 25 March 1991 (aged 84); Bishop's Waltham, Hampshire, England
- Spouse: Dorothea Spears (m. 1932)

Frank Sydney Spears (4 August 1906 – 25 March 1991) was a South African artist. He was born in Walsall, Staffordshire, England and arrived in South Africa as a designer for Brimble and Briggs Ltd. in 1928. He established a high profile as an artist, broadcaster and actor, also known for his success in business activities and as a designer of boats.

His early painting style was impressionistic, and his work was referred to, along with that of Sydney Carter (q.v.), as "staid, stuffy and provincial" (Lewis, 1946:25). He was elected President of the South African Society of Artists (SASA) in 1945 after first joining in 1934. In 1949, he travelled in the USA, and his style changed in response to the growing orthodoxy of abstraction there. In the 1950s he began to experiment with non-figuration, but was unable to relinquish his attachment to figurative elements. A personal mysticism began to shape much of his thought and he became interested in the relationship of painting, poetry and music.

This was well received by critics bored by the conservatism of SASA exhibitions in the 1940s. He was specially commended on the SASA Members' Exhibition of 1950 as follows: "Undoubtedly the best thing on the show is a smallish canvas 'Eileen Joyce plays Chopin', by Frank Spears. Here is a genuine attempt to interpret a musical theme in terms of paint; one feels the spirit of action in the moving chords placed in a flowing design" (P.H.W.: The Cape Times: 31.8.1950). Spears's handling of paint was thought by Berman to be analogous to that of Jean Welz (1900–1975): "His concepts are usually quiet and undramatic; still life and flower studies form a large part of his oeuvre. His palette is restrained, with distinctive use of ochres and warm pinkish tones, frequently accented by a characteristic note of Cerulean blue" (1983:434). Roses, from the SANG Permanent Collection, is typical of his later flower-pieces that were much admired. Spears retired in 1968 and in 1969 returned to England, but continued to exhibit in SA thereafter.

The painting "Descent from the Cross" can be viewed to the left of the High Altar at St. George's Cathedral, Cape Town

(Frank Sydney Spears is not to be confused with the Australian painter, "Frank H. Spears", (10 May 1904 Sydney – 21 Sep 1985 Western Australia). Frank Hilton Spears was born in Mosman (Sydney) and died in Attadale (near Perth). He was known for his beautiful landscapes and seascapes. His own Wikipedia entry is pending.)
