= St. George's Cathedral, Cape Town =

Coordinates: 33°55′30″S 18°25′10″E

St George's Cathedral
- Cathedral And Metropolitical Church of Saint George the Martyr
- The People’s Cathedral
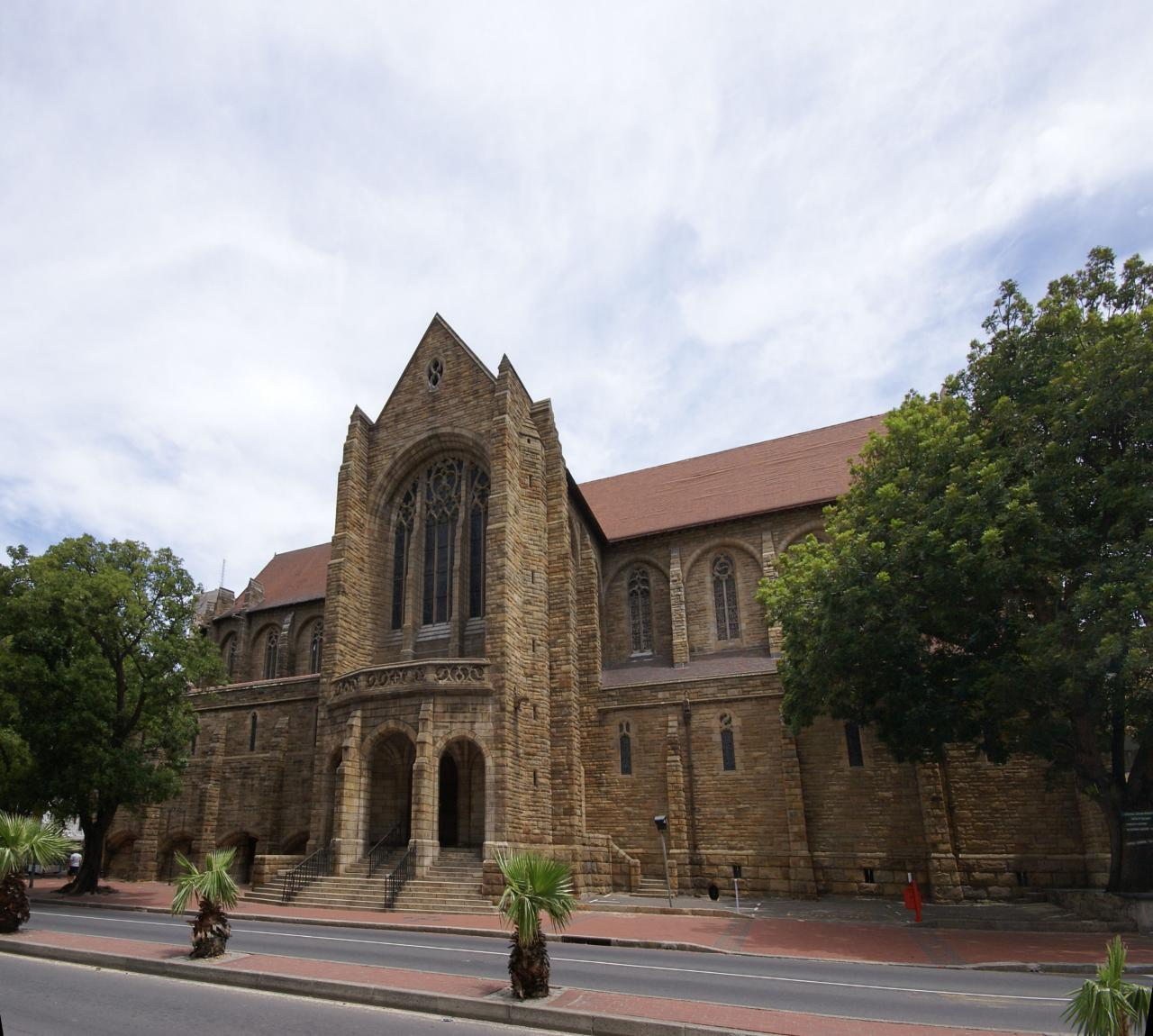
- St. George's Cathedral, north transept.
- St George's Cathedral
- Country: Cape Town, South Africa
- Denomination: Anglican Church of Southern Africa
- Churchmanship: Anglo-Catholic
- Website: www.sgcathedral.co.za

History
- Status: Cathedral
- Founded: 22 August 1901
- Dedication: St. George

Architecture
- Functional status: Active
- Heritage designation: Provincial Heritage Site
- Architect: Herbert Baker
- Architectural type: Gothic
- Style: Gothic

Administration
- Province: Southern Africa
- Archdiocese: Cape Town
- Archdeaconry: Cathedral
- Parish: Parish of Cape Town

Clergy
- Archbishop: Thabo Makgoba, Archbishop of Cape Town
- Bishop(s): Joshua Louw, Bishop of Table Bay
- Vicar: Mlamli Mfenyana
- Dean: Terrence Lester

St George's Cathedral (also referred to as The Cathedral Church of St George the Martyr) is the Anglican cathedral in Cape Town, South Africa, and the seat of the Archbishop of Cape Town. St. George's Cathedral is both the metropolitical church of the Anglican Church of Southern Africa and a congregation in the Diocese of Cape Town.

The cathedral was designed by Sir Herbert Baker and the first stones of the foundation were laid in 1901. The cathedral replaced an incomplete church that was originally built at that site.

== History ==
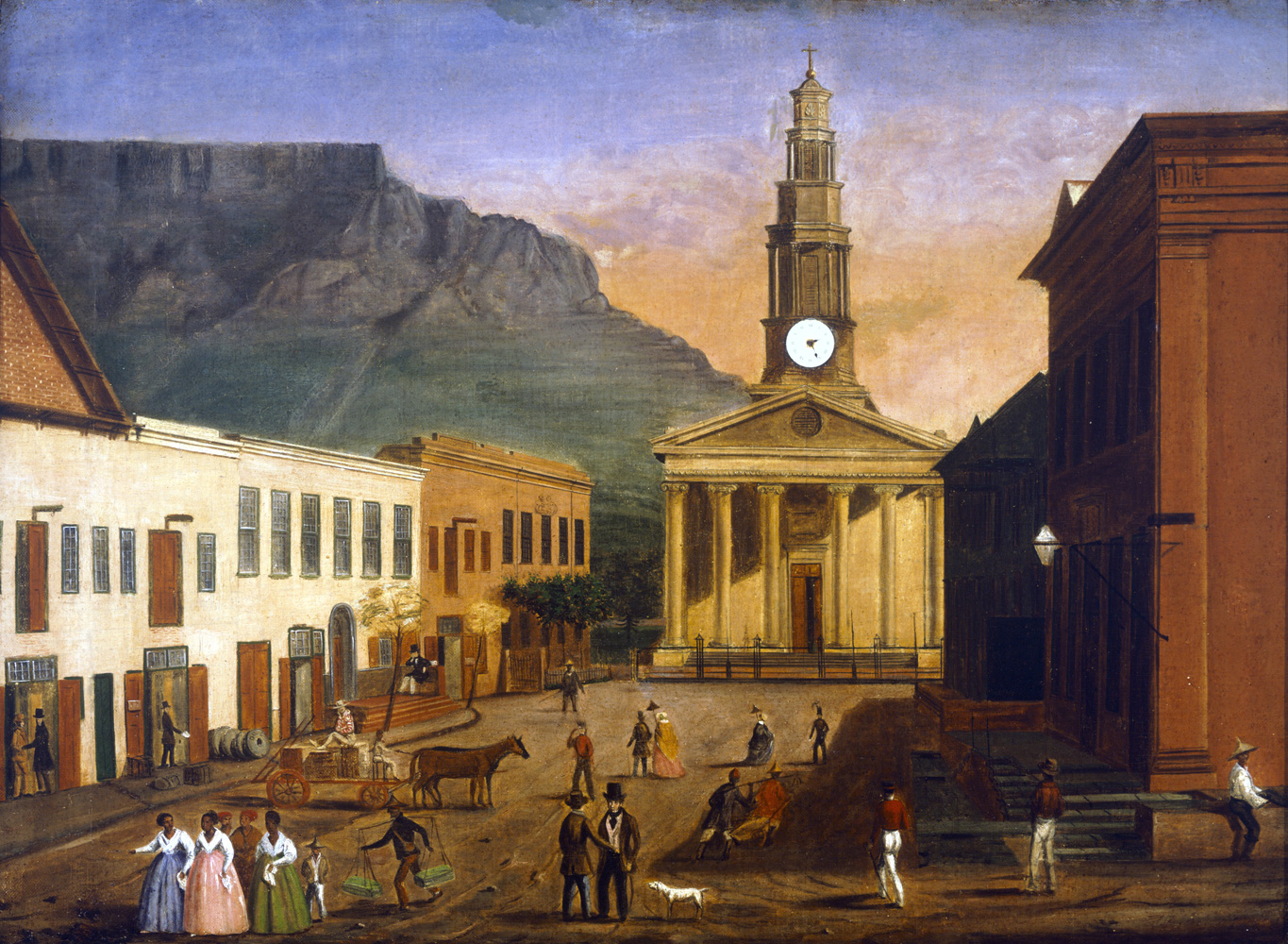
St. George's Cathedral and St. George's Street in by Wilhelm Langschmidt (1845)

In October 1827, the Bishop of Calcutta, on a visit to Cape Town, which was at the time a distant outpost of his diocese, discussed building an Anglican church. Until that time, the Anglican community used the Cape Town Castle for services, later being offered hospitality by the Groote Kerk. (In December 1819 missionaries Robert and Mary Moffat were married at "St Georges Church, Cape Town".)

The colonial government donated a site at the lower end of the Dutch East India Company's gardens at the corner of Government Avenue and Wale Street and the bishop consecrated the land. The foundation stone was laid by Governor Sir Lowry Cole on St. George's day 23 April 1830 and at the same time Erste Berg Dwars Street was renamed St. George's Street. The church was built from drawings by the architect John Skirrow based on W & H Inwood's Neo-Greek St. Pancras' Church in London. Losing heavily on the deal, Hermann Schutte was the building contractor. The cathedral cost an estimated £16,000 to build. On 21 December 1834 that St. George's Church opened for services. At the time of diplomat Edmund Roberts' visit in 1834, George Hough was chaplain and the church had a capacity of 1,000 people with 300 seats for the poor.

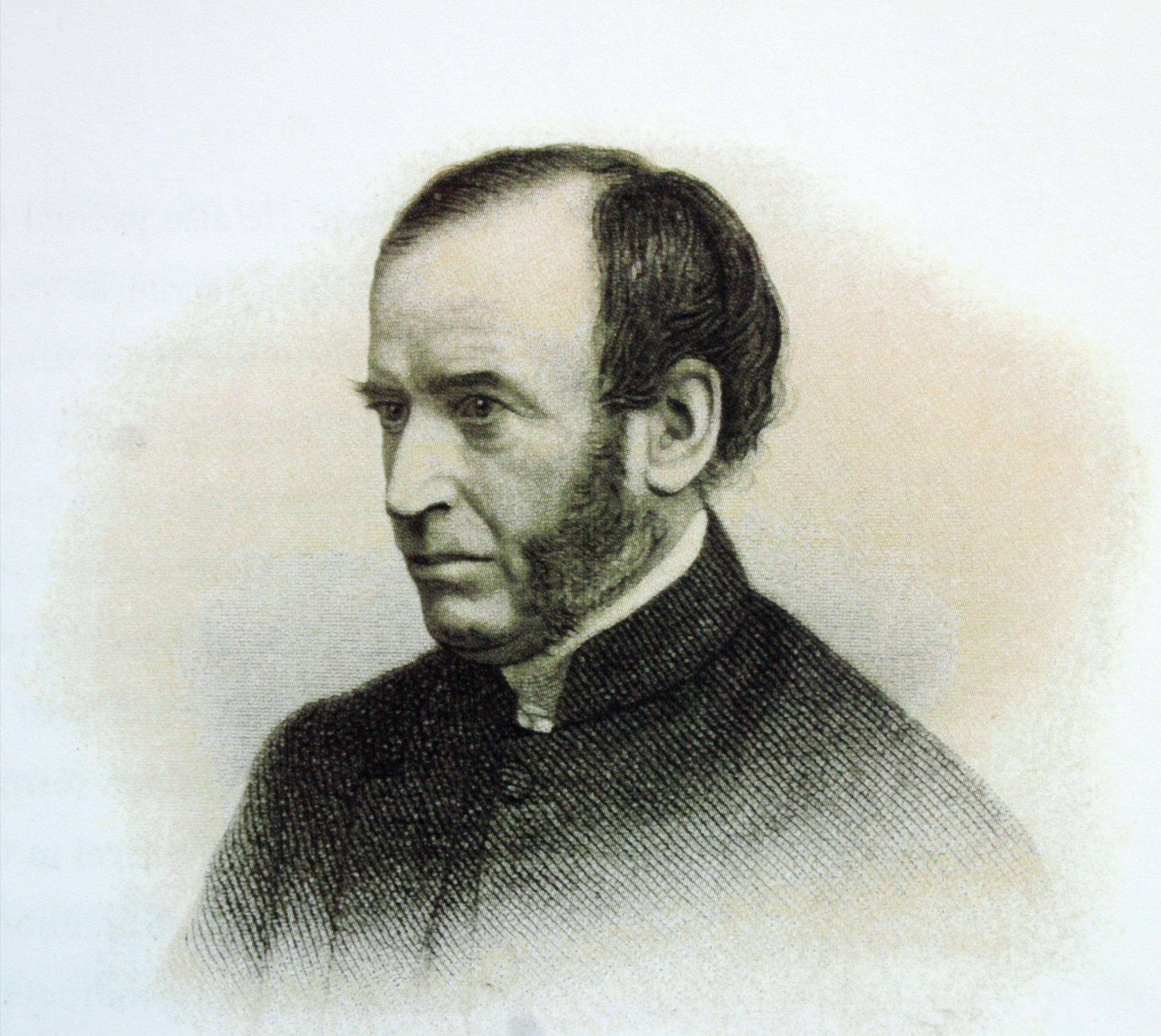
Bishop Robert Gray

In 1847, Robert Gray was ordained bishop of the newly created Diocese of Cape Town and he installed his cathedra (throne) in the church, by which act it became a cathedral even though it was only a modest parish church. His dream was to build a more worthy building on the site but his wishes never materialised during his episcopate which lasted until his death in 1872.

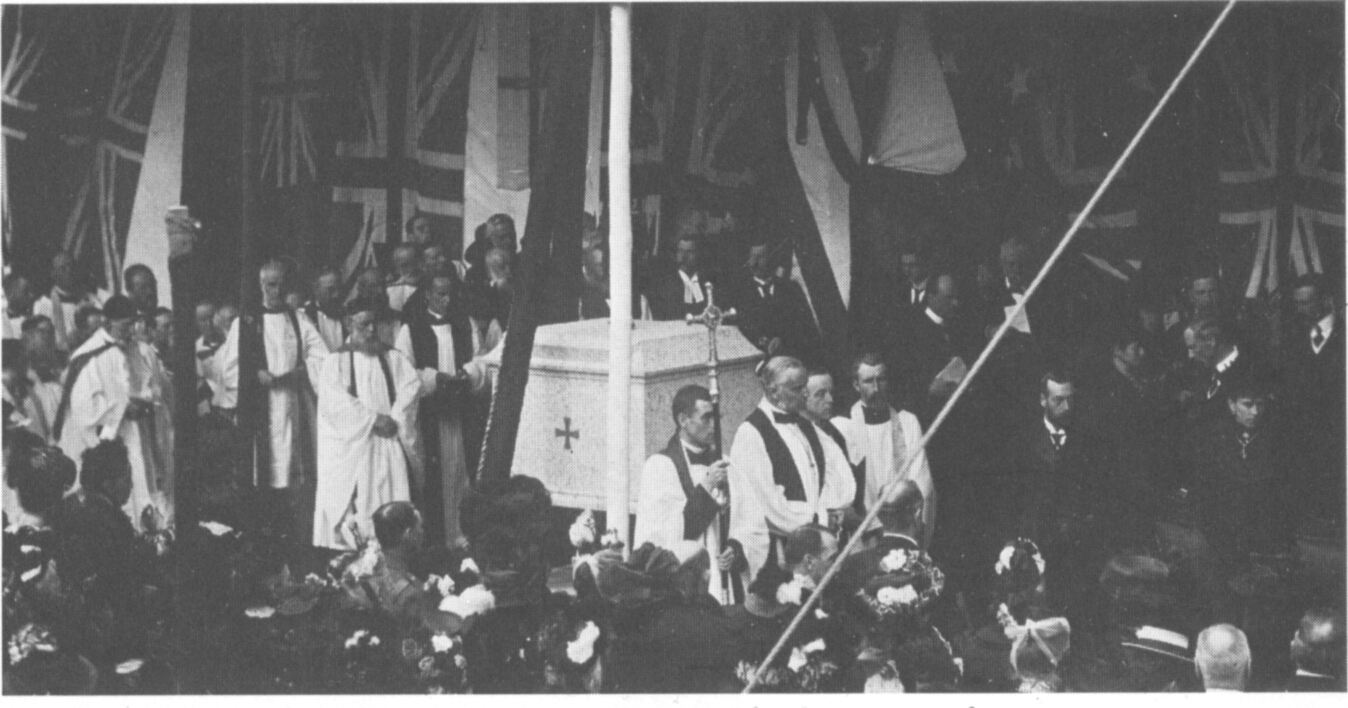
The laying of the foundation stone in 1901. On the right are the Duke and Duchess of Cornwall and York (later to become King George V and Queen Mary).

On 17 May 1874, William West Jones was ordained second bishop and metropolitan of Cape Town (almost 25 years later he was elevated to archbishop) and by 1887 the diocesan synod had appointed a committee to collect money for a new cathedral but it was not until 22 August 1901 that the Duke of Cornwall and York (later to become King George V) laid the foundation stone bearing the letters AMDG Latin: Ad Majorem Dei Gloriam, lit. 'To the Greater Glory of God'. Paradoxically, this is the only visible instance of these letters which are chiselled on the inward-facing surface of each and every stone in the cathedral, a custom dating from ancient times. The South-African War was still in progress at the time and as a result it was not until 1904 that work was resumed and the foundations were laid.

In 1908 West Jones returned to England. By the time of his departure, the eastern end of the cathedral was well under way but he died two months later. It was decided that the new chapel on the north side should be built in his memory and it was completed and dedicated on 28 October 1909 in honour of St John the Baptist, the patron saint of St John's College, Oxford, where he had been a fellow.

Work continued slowly but it was not until 1930 that the memorial stone for the north transept was laid by the Earl of Athlone, then Governor-General of the Union of South Africa. The transept was completed in 1936 which finally made Sir Herbert Baker's design a reality.

== Provincial heritage site ==
St George's Cathedral was declared a provincial heritage site by Heritage Western Cape on 23 September 2014 in the terms of Section 27 of the National Heritage Resources Act. This gives the site Grade II status and provides the site with protection under South African heritage law.

The cathedral is renowned for the political stance it took during apartheid and is recognised as a strong symbol for democracy in South Africa. The heritage significance the building lies not just with the building itself but also the intangible heritage associated with the actions of different clergymen involved in the church which led to the church (as of 26 August 2001) being known as the "people's cathedral". Desmond Tutu, the first black archbishop of South Africa, led numerous marches and campaigns for the formal end of apartheid from the front steps of the cathedral. It was a common meeting point for all activists of all races as well as woman's rights groups who were part the resistance to apartheid laws and the struggle for social justice, equality and human rights.

== Burials ==
The remains of Archbishop Emeritus Desmond Tutu are interred in front of the high altar. The remains of Edward Laurie King, Dean of Cape Town from 1958 until 1988, were re-interred in the chancel on the 20th of July 2025, during the 09:30am Cathedral Mass.

== Architecture ==
=== Bell tower and bells ===
The original cathedral had a tower containing eight bells cast in 1834 by the firm Mears & Stainbank of Whitechapel in London. They were rung by "chiming", whereby the clappers were pulled by rope to strike against the lip of the hanging bell. Two old brass plaques on the walls in the bell tower indicate the existence of an active guild of bellringers in the early 1900s.

When the original cathedral was demolished in the 1950s (see History) the bells were stored until a generous bequest by Mrs S K M Smith allowed them to be sent back to Mears & Stainbank where they were recast in 1963 into the ring of ten bells that we have today.

The bells made the return journey to Cape Town only to languish in the cathedral car park for some time. Eventually they were hung in a new steel frame - still on the ground outside the cathedral. In this position they were manually chimed until the new belltower structure was completed. Finally, in 1979 they were installed properly and hung for change ringing in the traditional English way with ropes and wheels.

The tower frame is built of reinforced concrete with a cladding of Table Mountain Sandstone.

The smallest of the ten bells, referred to as the treble, weighs 5 long cwt 1 qr 6 lb (594 lb or 269 kg) and the tenor, which is the largest, weighs in at a respectable 25 long cwt (2,800 lb or 1,300 kg). Its name, appropriate to its location on the southern tip of Africa, is "Good Hope". The bells were named by Joost de Blank, a former archbishop of Cape Town: Joy, Love, Peace, Faith, Charity, Service, Patience, Sacrifice, Redemption, and Good Hope.

=== Stained glass ===
The central panel of the great west window is dominated by the figure of the triumphant black Christ. The right-hand panel of this work includes the figure of Mahatma Gandhi.

The cathedral has stained glass windows, including fine Gabriel Loire windows. The most recent glass is his Christ in Triumph over Darkness and Evil in the great west window in memory of Earl Mountbatten. The centre light was erected in 1982; the two side panels on the left and right were added in 2001.

On either side of the nave are eight Gabriel Loire windows on the theme of the creation. Over the south transept is the rose window and in the centre, Christ in Majesty, clothed in purple, the colour of the passion and, radiating outwards, cherubim and seraphim, the angels, and the apostles, prophets, martyrs and saints.

=== Crypt ===
The cathedral's crypt houses a jazz restaurant and is known as The Crypt.

=== Link ===
The Link is an addition to the cathedral. The two stained glass windows set at the west end of the Link are from the old cathedral and this is the earliest glass in the cathedral. Two sets of eight windows were done by Mayer of Munich for the old cathedral in 1886. On the right is depicted the Ascension, this is a memorial to Robert Gray, first Bishop of Cape Town. The window on the left shows the Last Supper and is a memorial to a former churchwarden and trustee of the cathedral, Felton Matthew. There are only 11 disciples, the missing disciple is Judas Iscariot who can be seen clutching his bag of silver.

=== North aisle ===
Before entering the aisle you will see a plaque, commemorating the visit to the cathedral of Queen Elizabeth II and Prince Philip in March 1995. Pass the verger's office you will see four windows by Frank Spears. The first two above the office is dedicated to Michael Gibbs a former dean of Cape Town and shows the Nativity of Jesus. The other three are of the Crucifixion, Resurrection of Jesus and Ascension of Jesus and commemorate the Rackstraw family. Another memorial is in the form of a Latin inscription on the stonework at the end of the aisle. This is for the skilled master-mason, Neil Black, who was responsible for the north transept and aisle. He was a fine craftsman and modestly wished for no memorial. it is good to remember the man whose skill brought to reality Baker's design. In deference to his wishes and his fellow masons wanted a simple tribute, the inscription is not outlined and mellows with the stonework.

=== North transept ===
From the north aisle you come into the north transept, to your right is a carpeted platform on which the parish mass is celebrated on Sundays. The celebrant is in the body of the church not a distance at the high altar with his back to the congregation. Stand on the platform to view the great north window dedicated to the saints and the pioneers of the church in Africa. Executed by Francis Skeat, it was given by a Cape Town family in memory of their father. It was dedicated by Geoffrey Clayton in 1951. nine by seven metres (30 by 23 ft), it is the largest stained glass window in the Southern Hemisphere. The uppermost lights are taken by the arms of the diocese of the province. the top glass of the main glass shows from left to right St Augustine of Hippo, St Monica his mother, St Mark, (Note: St Mark is believed to be the first bishop of the Church of Alexandria) Our Lord learning to walk in Egypt, Athanasius of Alexandria, St Catherine of Alexandria, and St. Cyprian of Carthage. Below are the modern pioneers and heroes of the continent from right to left, Charles Mackenzie, bishop of Nyasaland, Angela Burdett-Coutts who endowed the bishopric of Cape Town. Above is master mason Neil Black; the martyr, Bernard Mizeki who was confirmed in Cape Town, Sophy Gray, wife of the first bishop Of Cape Town. The three centre panels depict the Flight into Egypt.

More stained glass is to be seen in the north transept, in the west wall are St Cyril of Jerusalem and St Antony of Egypt, the work of C.L. Grove a lecturer at the Michaelis School of Fine Art. Facing them are three windows. The first two on the left are by Edward Woore and show Robert Gray and Mother Cecile of Grahamstown, founder of the Community of the Resurrection of our Lord in Grahamstown. The third window is another by Gabriel Loire, it is said that Loire had the inspiration for the window when he looked across the Cape Flats at six o'clock one morning while visiting South Africa from his native France. The whole window is called Our Lady of Good Hope, the right light shows Saint Anne, mother of Mary, below her is Mary, mother of Jesus and then Christ in a shape of a chalice. the left light depicts the outline of the Cape Peninsula with its flora and fauna. At the top left is the Star of Good Hope and sweeping across the base of the window is an anchor. Loire put his patron saint, St Gabriel, in the tracery at the top.

=== Rose window and south transept ===
At the centre of the rose window is Christ in Majesty, clothed in purple the colour of the passion and around him a Greek inscription meaning Jesus Christ Triumphant. Around the central panel are ten lights like the petals of a rose, showing alternatively in red and blue seraphim and cherubim. These are the highest order of the angels all face inwards - with all the company of heaven we laud and magnify thy glorious name. The next group depicts angels flying from the periphery gorgeous in colour they sing out, 'To the all angels cry aloud. Around the perimeter of the window are twenty panels. If you think of the face of a clock, the section between 9 and 12 is the glorious company of the apostles from 12 to 3 the goodly fellowship of the prophets, between 3 and 6 the noble army of martyrs and lastly the saints of the Holy Church throughout the world. The window took Frank Spears two years to complete and cost £6,000 in the early 1930s. The three lancet windows below the rose window (from left) Hosea, King David and Isiah. Above them are St Peter, St John and Christ in the middle panel and Mary Magdalene at the empty tomb, respectively.

=== Pulpit and lectern ===
Both the pulpit and lectern are from the old cathedral and were presented in memory of the wreck of the mail ship SS Drummond Castle, which sank off Ushant on 16 June 1896.

=== Sanctuary and high altar ===
The high altar is of black marble, inlaid on the upper surface with five mosaic crosses brought from Jerusalem by Dean Charles Barnett-Clarke. Frank Spears' painting Descent from the Cross hangs on the north wall of the sanctuary. on the left of the altar is a simple wooden chair - the original throne (cathedra) of Robert Gray. It bears the bishop's arms and a small brass plaque inscribed in Latin: 'In this seat, Robert Our First Bishop and Metropolitan once sat'. There is another memorial to Robert Gray in the chancel, this is the archbishop's throne made from the choir screen of Westminster Abbey. Above the high altar is a suspended rood, at the foot of the crucified Christ are the Blessed Virgin Mary and St John. The floreated ends of the cross carry the signs of the four evangelists, St Matthew, St Mark, St Luke and St John. At the bottom of the rood is the figure of a pelican. There are four posts below with figures of angels.

=== Lady chapel ===
This quiet chapel is mainly used for private prayer, it was added in 1962. The stained glass is by Francis Spear, the two lights at the west end show the soldier saints, Martin of Tours and Saint Alban, the first English martyr. The circular window above the altar is a pietà - the Blessed Virgin with her crucified Son lying across her knees. Surrounding the central figures is a symbolic treatment of the burning bush of Moses, its stem shows as the tree of knowledge, with the lilies of the Virgin and the vine of the Eucharist above the red cross of sacrifice and triumph is superimposed on the whole. The silver lamp above the altar burns perpetually while the reserved sacrament is kept in the tabernacle on the altar. There is also a statue of the Virgin and Child. On the outside wall of the Lady Chapel is a stone carving of the Mother and Child by Sir Charles Wheeler.

=== St David's Chapel ===
This chapel is Situated to the right of the Sanctuary, as you enter you will see the Canterbury stone- a block of Caen stone used in the earliest Norman section of that Great Cathedral. The Chapel is one of the earliest parts of the Cathedral to be completed. The Bronze Crucifix affixed to it is a Model of am eighth Century brooch found over a century ago under a Canterbury street. The Chapel is a Memorial to all who died in the South African War (1899-1902). in addition it has a numerous associations with Wales, such as the Figure of Saint David, patron Saint of Wales above the altar. The Stone altar was given by Sir Owen and Lady Phillips in Memory of Welshman who fell in the war. There is a Small Stained glass window of Saint David, another figure of Saint David is in bas-relief on the wall, this is in memory of Charles Nuemann Thomas a former organist of the Cathedral. on the Outer wall of the Chapel are two brilliant thick glass in modern Style by Leo Theron they Symbolize the Eucharist and Baptism There is a set of wrought-iron gates at the end of Saint David's Chapel, they were made by John Stevens and are a memorial to Archbishop John Russel

=== St John The Baptist Chapel ===
The Altar and the painting in this Chapel came from the old St George's. The painting was a gift to the old cathedral in 1871 and is a copy of Vincenzo Foppa's Adoration of the Magi by Henry Duke. The paneled teak Reredos commemorates Archbishop William Marlborough Carter and bears his private arms and those of Eton and Pembroke College where he received his education. This Chapel is a memorial to Archbishop Jones, and his bronze effigy lies on an empty tomb on the south side. An inscription in gilt records the main events of his life, and the words Lord I have loved the habitation of Thy house are a reminder that his devotion to St George's laid the foundations of the Cathedral. The windows in the chapel were donated by the West Jones family and were installed in 1910 and 1911; they came from the studios of Kempe & Co. Ltd., and were the work of their chief designer John Lisle. The East Window above the altar has two lights and depicts the Lord's commission to St Peter and to all Bishops as Shepherds of Souls and pastors of his flock. The words feed my sheep appear on a scroll above Christ's head and above the head of St Peter are the words Lord Thou Knowest that I love Thee. The accent on St Peter derives from the fact that both Bishop Gray and Archbishop West Jones were consecrated in the Abbey Church of St. Peter, Westminster. The four Lancet windows in the north wall show the Bishops of African and English Sees i.e. St Athanasius, St Augustine of Hippo, St Augustine of Canterbury and William Laud, Archbishop of Canterbury. Left on the altar is a tiny single light showing John.

== Gallery ==
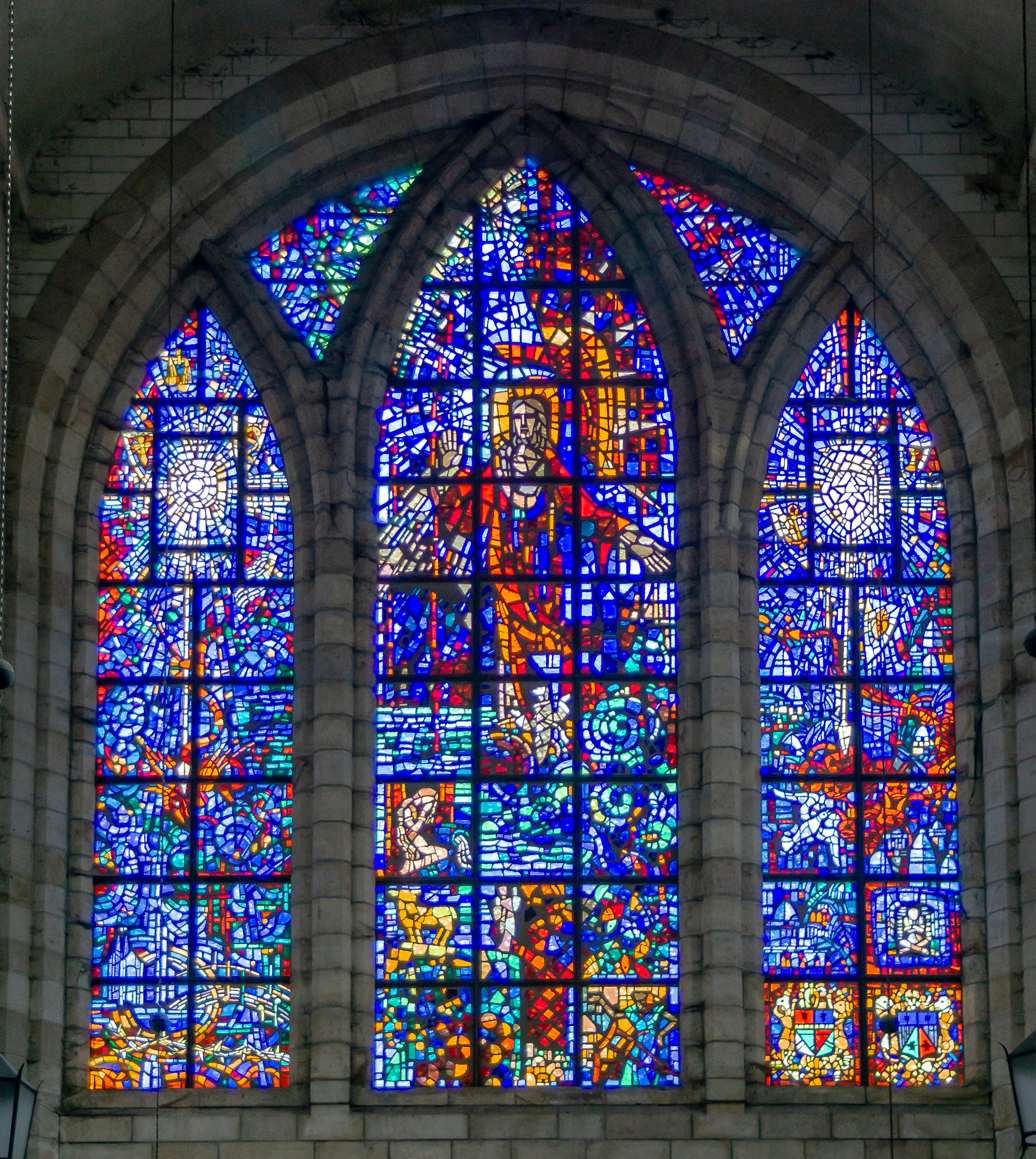
Christ in Triumph over Darkness and Evil, stained glass window by French artist Gabriel Loire in memory of Earl Mountbatten of Burma, at St George's Cathedral, Cape Town.

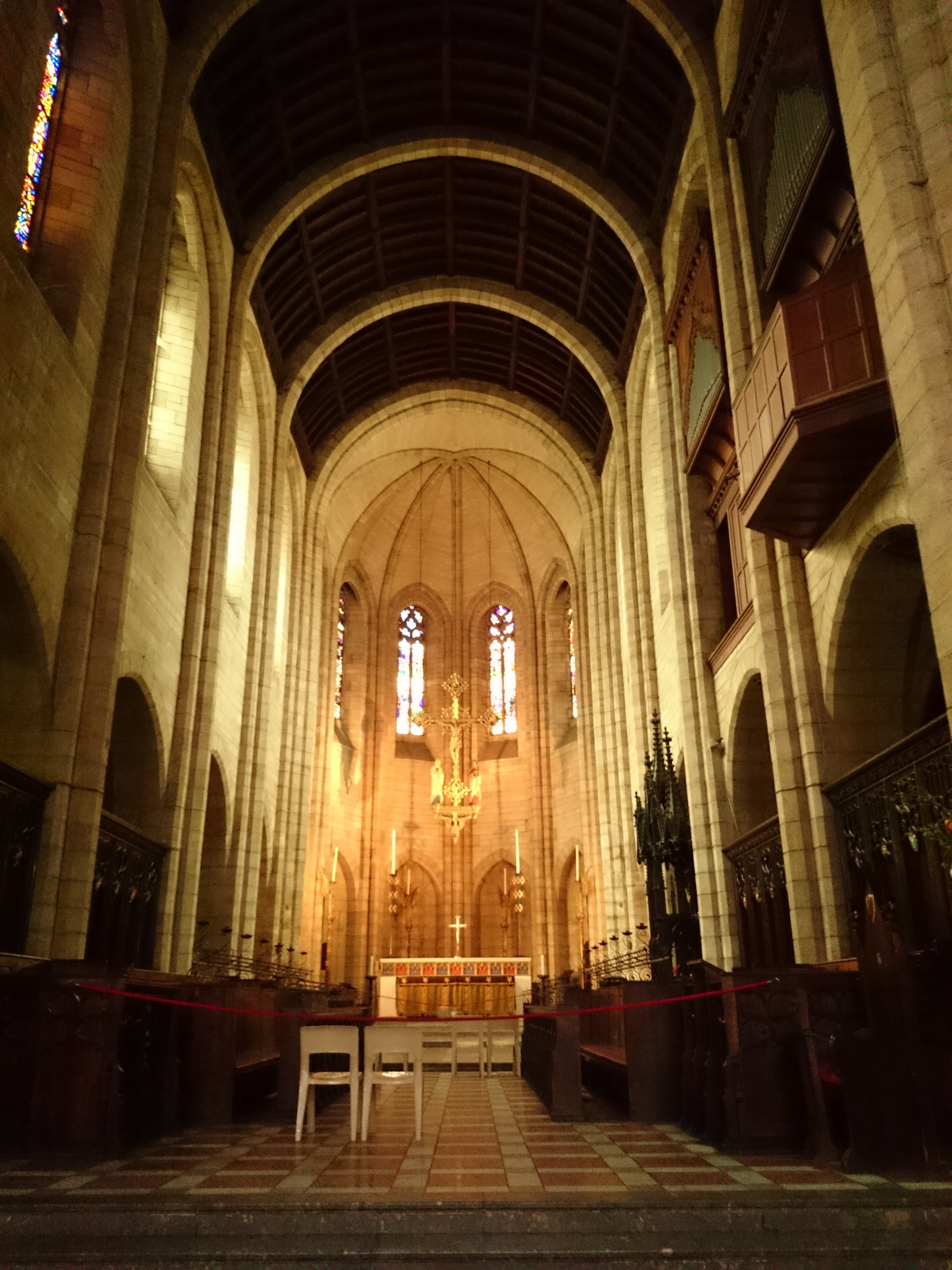

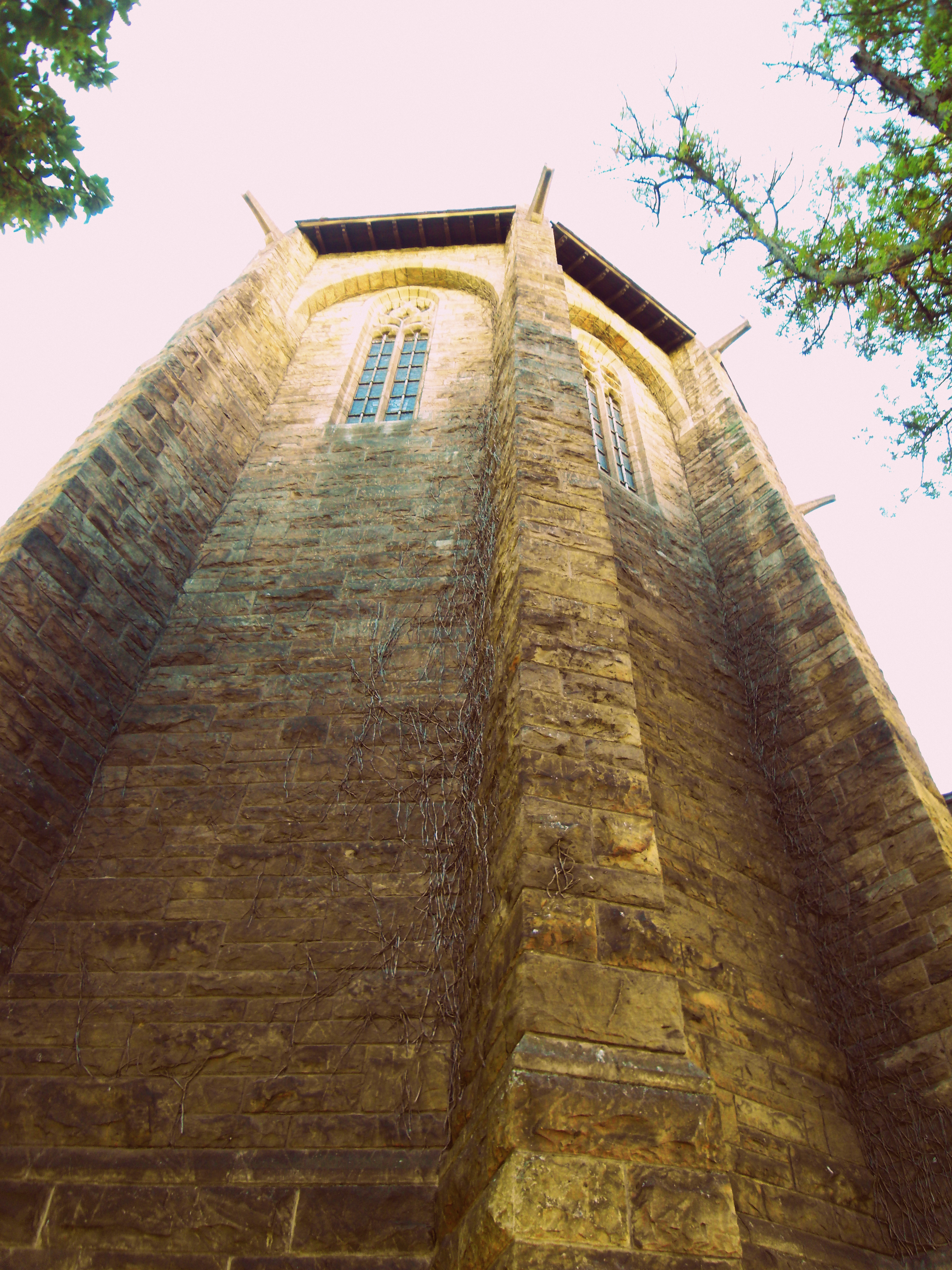
St. George's Cathedral walls.

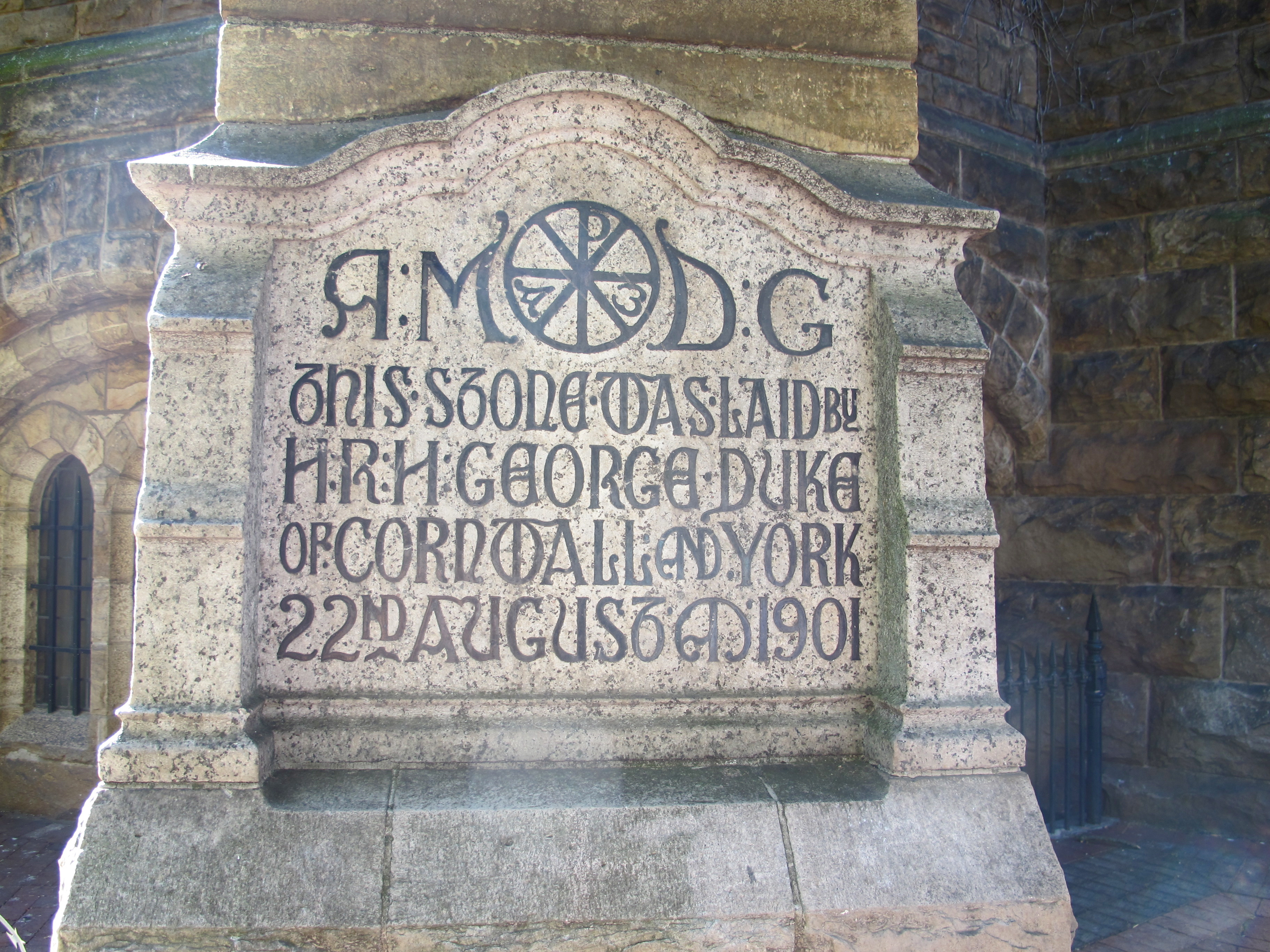
The foundation stone laid in 1901.

== See also ==
- St. Mary's Cathedral, Cape Town: the city's Roman Catholic Cathedral
- Saint George: Devotions, traditions and prayers
- Barry Smith

== Notes and references ==
- Elphick, Richard (1997). Christianity in South Africa: A Political, Social, and Cultural History. University of California Press. ISBN 978-0-520-20940-4.
- Kenyon, Roger, ed. (1980). The Cathedral Church of St George the Martyr. Cape Town: Printpak Books.
- Bock, Mary; Gordon, Judith, eds. (2012). St George's Cathedral: Heritage and Witness. Cape Town: PreText Publishing.
- Langham-Carter, R. R. (1977). St. George's Church. Cape Town: A.A.Balkema.
- Runkle, John Ander (2002). Searching for Sacred Space: Essays on Architecture and Liturgical Design in the Episcopal Church. Church Publishing. ISBN 978-0-89869-371-3.
- Roberts, Edmund (1837). Embassy to the Eastern Courts of Cochin-China, Siam, and Muscat. New York: Harper & Brothers.
- Smith, Barry (1969). An historical survey of the organs, organists and music of St. George's Cathedral, Cape Town, from 1834 to 1952 (M.A.). Grahamstown: Rhodes University. hdl:10962/d1004745.
