= Meidner =

Meidner is a surname. Notable people with the surname include:

- Hans Meidner (1914–2001), South African plant physiologist
- Ludwig Meidner (1884–1966), German expressionist painter and printmaker
- Else Meidner, née Meyer (1901–1987), German painter, wife of Ludwig
- Rudolf Alfred Meidner (1914–2005), German-Swedish economist
  - Rehn–Meidner Model, an economic model developed in 1951
  - Rehn-Meidner Macroeconomics to Neo-liberalism
