= Marianne Fannin =

Irish botanical artist

- Born: 2 March 1845; Dublin, Ireland
- Died: 18 November 1938 (aged 93); Heidelberg, Gauteng, South Africa
- Known for: botanical painting

Marianne or Edda Fannin (2 March 1845 – 18 November 1938) was an Irish botanical artist, known for her work painting the flora of South Africa. She was regarded as one of the principle South African botanical artists of her time.

== Life ==
Marianne Edwardine Fannin was born in Dublin on 2 March 1845, the daughter of Thomas and Ellen Fannin. When Fannin was a few months old, her family emigrated from Dublin to Cape Colony. Initially they lived on the Cape of Good Hope. They then took up residence on the Dargle, a tributary of the Umgeni River, and it was named after the River Dargle near Dublin by Fannin's father. The local district is now known by the name Dargle.

Fannin first married the Reverend Eustace Wilberforce Jacob in 1869. The couple travelled to England in 1871, with Jacob dying soon after their arrival. Fannin remained in England for a period, studying music and painting. She returned to South Africa in 1875. From 1878, she lived in Transvaal, marrying the Reverend Alfred Roberts in 1879 whom she met through a mission party. Roberts later went on to become an archdeacon in the Diocese of Pretoria. The couple lived in Potchefstroom from 1881 to 1896, where they had two sons. Their son, Dr Austin Roberts, went on to become an eminent ornithologist. Fannin was one of the founding member of St. Mary's Diocesan School for Girls, Pretoria, and Roberts served as headmaster of the boys' school St Birinus's. In 1881, during the siege of Pretoria, Fannin returned to the family home in Natal. Fannin died on 18 November 1938, either in Heidelberg, Gauteng, or at New Muckleneuk, Pretoria.

== Artistic career ==
Fannin appears to have been a self-taught artist. She was encouraged by her older brother, George Fox Fannin a keen botanist, to study the local flora of South Africa. Their interest lay primarily in orchids and Asclepiadoideae (milkweeds). This interest led to Fannin pressing and painting the plants George collected and sending the illustrations to William Henry Harvey at Trinity College, Dublin. Harvey was so impressed by her paintings, he named an orchid in her honour, crediting her as its discoverer. Around 1869, Fannin painted an album detailing the flowers of Natal. In 1878, Fannin was a member of a mission party led by Bishop Henry Bousfield, and during their journey from Durban to Pretoria Fannin made sketches of the surrounding countryside. Whilst living in Transvaal, Fannin painted wildflowers and landscapes. Her flower paintings are held by the School of Botany, Trinity College, Dublin. Her landscapes are held in private collections in South Africa.

== Eponymous taxa ==
- Disperis fanniniae Harv. 1863
- Sisyranthus fanniniae N.E. Br.
- Streptocarpus fanniniae Harv. Ex C. B. Cl.
