= Talbot House =

Talbot House may refer to:

- Talbot House, Scarborough, a building in North Yorkshire, in England
- Talbot House: a house of Worksop College, England.
- Toc H, nickname for Talbot House, in Poperinge, Belgium; set up by Chaplains Tubby Clayton and Neville Talbot in 1915 as a rest centre for Allied soldiers in World War I.
- Talbot House, Manchester, a charity in Manchester
