= Dale Bowers =

Anglican bishop

The Right Reverend Dale Bowers
- Bishop of Saint Helena
- Church: Anglican Church of Southern Africa
- Diocese: Saint Helena
- Installed: 2018
- Predecessor: Richard Fenwick

Orders
- Consecration: November 2018 by Thabo Makgoba

Personal details
- Born: Saint Helena

Dale Bowers is the Anglican Bishop of Saint Helena.

Bowers was consecrated a bishop by Thabo Makgoba (Archbishop of Cape Town), Stephen Diseko (Bishop of Matlosane), and Allan Kannemeyer (Bishop of Pretoria). His consecration at St Paul's Cathedral in 2018 was the first to be held on the island, made more practical by the opening of Saint Helena Airport in 2016. Bowers is the second Bishop of St Helena to have been born on the island.

Before becoming bishop, Bowers was vicar of Jamestown in St Helena.

Anglican Church of Southern Africa titles
Preceded by Richard Fenwick	Bishop of St Helena; 2018–	Incumbent
