= Christ Church, Polokwane =

Coordinates: 23°54′15″S 29°27′20″E

Christ Church is a parish in the Anglican Diocese of St Mark the Evangelist, which falls under the Anglican Church of Southern Africa. It is the only Anglican church in Polokwane (previously, Pietersburg). The church has a long and diverse history going back over a hundred years.

== History ==
Pietersburg was founded in 1886 and by 1895 there were about 800 residents. Prior to 1894 there had been occasional services for the English Church held by visiting priests in the local Court House. In 1894, Hugh Bousfield, son of Henry Bousfield, the first Bishop of Pretoria, was prospecting near Pieterburg. A congregant, E.G. Ireland, later Pietersburg's first mayor, impressed upon Bousfield the need for the bishop to visit Pietersburg.

In 1895 a message was again sent to the Bishop of Pretoria, telling him there was a strong feeling that he should visit the area and make arrangements to establish the church on a more permanent basis. The bishop duly arrived and agreed to provide a clergyman for the town and district. A. Weinstein arrived soon afterwards and in his first service on 12 May 1895 preached on "God’s love to Men." The first entry in the Vestry Book of the "English Church in Pietersburg" is a statement of accounts for the period 12 May 1895 to 31 March 1896.

Work began on building a church in Market Street in 1895 and two years later the work was completed. In 1897 it is recorded that services were also held out at Leydsdorp, Spelonken and Nylstroom (now, Modimolle). Members of the congregation otherwise had to trek many miles to attend services in Pietersburg.

In the 1898 register, prayers for smallpox and drought were recorded. On several occasions no services were held because of heavy rains. During 1899 church attendance dropped as church members left town because of the threat of war. The last meeting of the church council, before the Anglo-Boer War (Boer Wars), took place on 2 August 1899. By that November only twenty British subjects were left in Pietersburg. Church records are sparse during the war, but it appears that the rector may have even been imprisoned during 1900. Church services resumed in November 1901.

After the war, accessible records from old Service Registers, Council Minutes and Vestry Minutes settle into a familiar pattern: car and building maintenance, fund-raising, church attendance and the arrival or departure of rectors.

In 1931 the site of the present church (erf. 569, corner of Devenish and Biccard Streets) was purchased complete with a house for use as the Rectory. In 1949 a building fund was started and in 1951 a definite decision was taken to build a new church on the Rectory site. The old building was showing its age, termites had got into the walls and fear was expressed that the roof would eventually become dangerous.

On 20 June 1957 the church celebrated its Diamond Jubilee. The guest preacher was Frank Clarke.

In March 1960, the Vicar General, Frederick Amoore, laid the foundation stone of the new hall and vestry. The last service held in the old building that had served this congregation for over sixty years was held on Sunday, 25 September 1960. In July, 1968 Architects were commissioned to plan the new church and on Saturday 30 November, the foundation stone of the new church was laid by J.A. Goddard. This honour was accorded him in recognition of the many years of devoted and unbroken service he had given to Christ Church since 1927. In 1969 the church and a flat for the curate were completed at a cost of R35,500. The dedication of the church by the Bishop of Pretoria took place on Sunday, 10 August 1969.

In 1995 Christ Church celebrated a hundred years of an Anglican congregation in Polokwane / Pietersburg.

Martin Breytenbach, the second bishop of the Anglican Diocese of St Mark the Evangelist resisted the call for many years to have a cathedral in the diocese. He, like his predecessor, Philip Le Feuvre, believed that the diocese was far from being established and so any talk of establishing a cathedral was premature.

In 2009 the bishop began thinking about the needs of Polokwane itself. It is rapidly transforming from a small city into a full-scale city. The open land between Polokwane and Seshego is rapidly filling up with houses. New suburbs are opening up to the north, east and south. New shopping malls are opening up and existing ones are doubling in size.

With the support of Chapter, the Trustees, Diocesan Standing Committee and Christ Church Council, the bishop moved towards proclaiming Christ Church a cathedral in 2011. A dean was appointed as well as a sub-dean. Consequently, the list of rectors was discontinued and a new list of deans and sub-deans started. Christ Church was consecrated as a cathedral on 18 June 2011.

== Rectors ==
The personal history of many of these rectors can be found on the Christ Church Cathedral website.

- 1895 - Andrew Weinstein
- 1895 - N. Grellier
- 1895 - H. Pughe-Jones
- 1900 - interregnum during the Second Anglo-Boer War
- 1903 - A.G. Forbes
- 1905 - P.M. Aldous
- 1907 - C.J. Clairmonte
- 1909 - J.H. Banks (acting - 2 months)
- 1909 - F. Carter
- 1912 - N. Roberts
- 1915 - W.O. Wellington
- 1919 - interregnum
- 1920 - S. Weaver
- 1921 - Latimer Fuller
- 1931 - A. Edington
- 1934 - F.G. Clarke (released to serve as chaplain to the Regiment Botha)
- 1943 - H.F.A. Treble
- 1946 - S.C. Culbert
- 1956 - H.E. Wraige
- 1964 - W. Lovegrove
- 1966 - T. Verryn
- 1970 - A.V. Campbell
- 1972 - J. Hannah (acting - 15 months)
- 1973 - Mark Nye, suffragan bishop
- 1978 - D. Narraway
- 1980 - interregnum
- 1981 - F. Hugill
- 1985 - A. Williams
- 1989 - J. Hughes
- 1995 - A. Smith
- 2003 - interregnum
- 2005 - D. Bertram
- 2008 - P. Houston (acting - 4 months)
- 2009 - P. Mudzvovera

== Deans ==
- 2011 - 2019 - Luke Pretorius
- 2019 - 2021 - Dalcy Dlamini

== Sub-Deans ==
- 2011-2013 - P. Mudzvovera

== Sources ==
- Diocese of Pretoria Website: Historical Documents
- Parish of Christ Church: Service Register (records of services and rectors)
- Growing Up in Grace & Going Out in Love (1995), a publication for the 100 year celebration of the Christ Church congregation
- Martin Breytenbach Ad Clerum: Winter (2010)
