= Luke Pretorius =

Luke Pretorius is a South African Anglican bishop emiterus: he served as Bishop of St Mark the Evangelist, a diocese of the Anglican Church of Southern Africa (ACSA), from 2019 to January 2026.

Pretorious was educated at St Paul's Theological College and ordained in 1990. He served his title at Greytown, KwaZulu-Natal, after which he was appointed Rector of St. Mary's Richmond, KwaZulu-Natal. On moving to Limpopo in 2000, he was instituted as the incumbent of the Parish of the Letaba and then made Archdeacon of Mopani. In May 2011 he served as Dean of Christ Church Cathedral, Polokwane.

== Notes ==
Anglican Church of Southern Africa titles
Preceded by Martin Breytenbach	Diocese of St Mark the Evangelist; 2000 - 2019	Incumbent
