= Kannemeyer =

Kannemeyer is a surname. Notable people with the surname include:

- Allen Kannemeyer (born 1959), South African Anglican bishop
- Anton Kannemeyer (born 1967), South African comics artist
- Bruce Kannemeyer (1965–2025), South African politician and public servant
- Daniel Rossouw Kannemeyer (1843–1925), South African archaeologist and paleontologist
- David Kannemeyer (born 1977), South African footballer
- John Christoffel Kannemeyer (1939–2011), South African literary historian
- Quinton Kannemeyer (born 1984), South African cricketer
- Tiaan Kannemeyer (born 1978), South African cyclist
