= Lavinia Talbot =

British promoter of women's education (1849–1939)

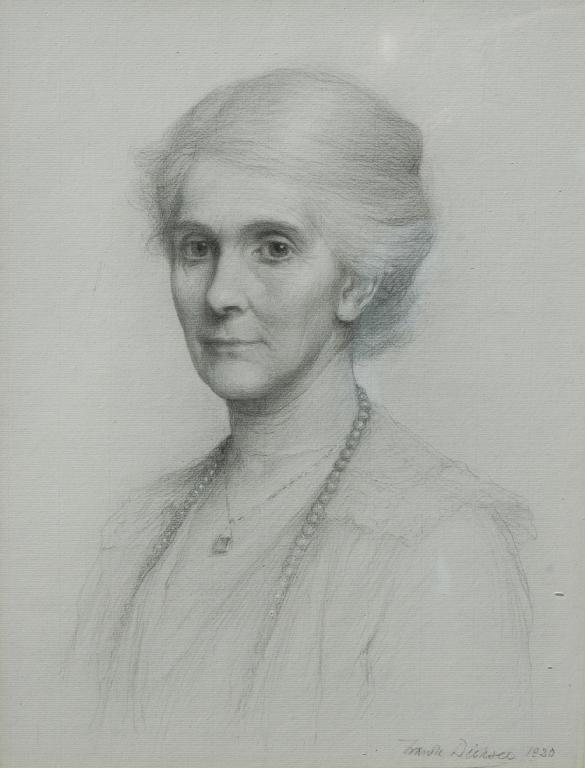
- by Frank Dicksee
- Born: Lavinia Lyttelton; 4 January 1849; London, England
- Died: 9 October 1939 (aged 90); Wantage, Oxfordshire England
- Organization: Association for Promoting the Education of Women
- Spouse: Edward Talbot
- Children: 5, including Edward Keble Talbot and Neville Talbot
- Parents: George Lyttelton, 4th Baron Lyttelton (father); Mary Glynne (mother)

Hon. Lavinia Talbot (née Lyttelton, 4 January 1849 – 9 October 1939) was a British promoter of women's education in the United Kingdom. She was a member of the Association for Promoting the Education of Women.

== Life ==
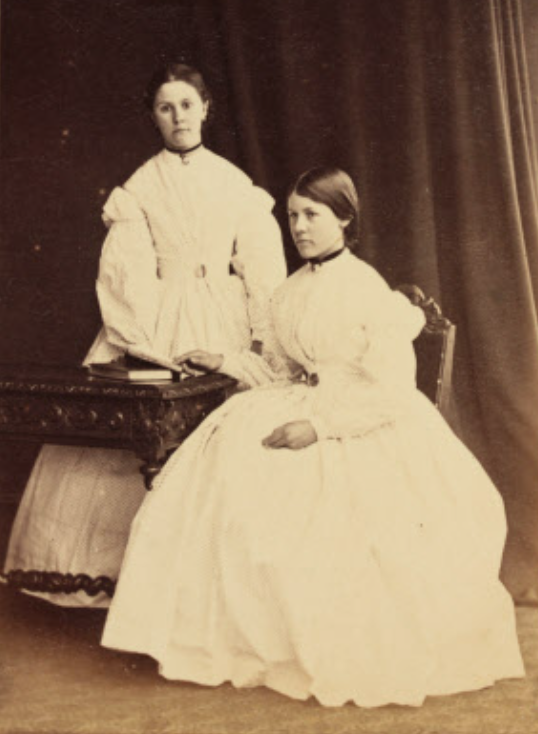
Lavinia and her next older sister Ma(r)y Lyttleton

Lavinia Lyttelton was born in London in 1849. She was the seventh child of George Lyttelton, 4th Baron Lyttelton and Mary, Lyttelton née Glynne, and grew up in the family seat of Hagley Hall in Worcestershire. She had eleven siblings, and in 1864 her elder sisters left her, aged fifteen, to care for her father, younger sister, and eight brothers at Hagley Hall. She escaped five years later when her father remarried and the following year she married. Her new husband however had become the warden at Keble College the year before and she had a new house to run. She took relief attending the lectures for women organised by an ad-hoc group which included Mary Ward, Louise Creighton and Charlotte Byron Green.

Members of the committee who organised the lectures for women moved on to join the Association for Promoting the Education of Women in Oxford, including Mary Ward, Louise Creighton, Charlotte Byron Green and Lavinia Talbot. She was joined by her husband and many realised that they would need a new hall where women students could live whilst at university. The consensus was split on religious grounds and Somerville Hall, which ignored a woman's denomination was partnered by Lady Margaret Hall which the Talbots, as strong Anglicans, supported.

In 1913 she backed the controversial invitation of Maude Royden, a woman, to talk to the all-male Church Congress about White Slavery.

Talbot died in Wantage, Oxfordshire, England in 1939, aged 90.

== Family ==
She married Edward Stuart Talbot, the son of Hon. John Chetwynd-Talbot, son of Charles Chetwynd-Talbot, 2nd Earl Talbot, and his mother was Caroline Jane Stuart-Wortley, daughter of James Stuart-Wortley, 1st Baron Wharncliffe.

Their children were:

- Mary Catherine Talbot (2 October 1875 – 2 September 1957) who married Lionel Ford
- Revd Edward Keble Talbot (31 December 1877 – 21 October 1949)
- Rt Revd Neville Stuart Talbot, Bishop of Pretoria (21 August 1879 – 3 April 1943)
- Lavinia Caroline Talbot (15 April 1882 – 30 September 1950)
- Gilbert Walter Lyttelton Talbot (1 September 1891 – 30 July 1915, killed in action at Ypres), and after whom the Toc H Christian organisation was named
