= St. Mary's Diocesan School for Girls, Pretoria =

St. Mary's Diocesan School for Girls

Location
- 186 Duxbury Road, Hillcrest; Pretoria, Gauteng; South Africa; 25°45′18″S 28°14′31″E

Information
- School type: All-girls private school
- Motto: Filiae Regis (Daughter of King)
- Religious affiliation: Diocese of Pretoria
- Denomination: Anglican
- Patron saint: St Mary
- Established: 8 September 1879; 147 years ago
- Founder: The Rt Revd Henry Bousfield
- Sister school: St. Alban's College (Former)
- School number: 012 366 0500
- Headmaster: Mrs Howard
- Exam board: IEB
- Staff: 100 full-time
- Grades: 000–12
- Gender: Female
- Age: 3 to 18
- Language: English
- Schedule: 07:30 - 14:10
- Hours in school day: 6h30
- Campus: Urban Campus
- Campus type: Suburban
- Houses: St Andrew's; St David's; St George's; St Patrick's
- Colours: Blue; Brown
- Nickname: St Mary's
- Rivals: Pretoria High School for Girls; St Mary's School, Waverley
- School fees: R252,000 (boarding); R161,400 (tuition)
- Alumni: Old Girls

St. Mary's Diocesan School for Girls is an Anglican private boarding school for girls situated in Hillcrest, Pretoria in the Gauteng province of South Africa, St Mary's DSG was founded in 1879 by the Rt Revd Henry Bousfield, the first Bishop of Pretoria. For 75 years of its existence the school was run by the nuns of the Community of St Mary the Virgin. The brother school is St. Alban's College.

The school was established in 1871 by Henry Bousfield known as St Etheldreda's but it became St Mary's DSG later on. It is known as one of the oldest schools in Pretoria. It is one of the most prestigious schools in South Africa.

== History ==
=== St Etheldreda's 1879–1909 ===
The school was known as St Etheldreda by Bishop Henry Bousfield. It later became St Mary's DSG. Initially it was situated at No. 279 Skinner Street. Later it moved to Hillcrest.

The school had 20 pupils in 1886 and 75 pupils in 1889. The school cost £1,500 of which only £300 was immediately available. By 1895, the rest was raised by the bishop, friends, 138 pupils and nine academic member of staff.

==== St Mary's DSG establishment ====
Henry Bousfield died and all seemed lost. The Headmistress resigned and return to England and 25 pupils remained at St Etheldreda's. The Education Department suggested that the school buildings might be used as a hostel for the newly established girls high school in Arcadia called Pretoria High School for Girls.

When the Bishop William Carter was appointed as second Bishop of Pretoria (1903–1909).

== Sports ==
- Athletics
- Basketball
- Chess
- Cross country
- Equestrian
- Hockey
- Netball
- Soccer
- Squash
- Swimming
- Tennis
- Volleyball

== Notes and references ==
- Addison, Betty (1979). Daughters of the king: the story of St. Mary's Diocesan school for girls, Pretoria, 1879–1979. Governing Body of St. Mary's Diocesan School for Girls.
