= Edward Keble Talbot =

English Anglican priest

The Reverend Fr Edward Keble Talbot MC KHC CR
- Superior of the Community of the Resurrection
- Church: Church of England
- In office: 1922 to 1940
- Predecessor: Walter Frere
- Successor: Raymond Raynes

Orders
- Ordination: 1904

Personal details
- Born: 31 December 1877
- Died: 21 October 1949 (aged 71)
- Denomination: Anglicanism

Edward Keble Talbot MC KHC (31 December 1877 – 21 October 1949) was an English Anglican priest, who was the Superior of the Community of the Resurrection, a religious community for men in Mirfield, West Yorkshire.

== Early life and family ==
Talbot was the son of the education campaigner Lavinia Talbot and Edward Stuart Talbot, the first Warden of Keble College, Oxford, who later became Bishop of Rochester, Bishop of Southwark and then Bishop of Winchester; Talbot's brother, Neville Stuart Talbot, became Bishop of Pretoria.

Talbot was educated at Winchester and then Christ Church, Oxford, where he obtained a second-class degree in Literae Humaniores (classics).

== Ordained ministry ==
Talbot was ordained in 1904. From 1904 to 1906, he was curate of St Mary's Church, Woolwich in south-east London. He joined the Community of the Resurrection in 1906.

With the outbreak of the First World War, Talbot was commissioned into the British Army as a temporary Chaplain to the Forces 4th Class (equivalent in rank to captain) on 21 August 1914. In the 1916 King's Birthday Honours, he was awarded the Military Cross (MC). From 18 April 1916 to 19 February 1917, he held the temporary rank of Chaplain to the Forces 3rd Class (equivalent in rank to major) while serving as the senior chaplain of a division. On 15 February 1918, he was a made a temporary Chaplain to the Forces 2nd Class (equivalent in rank to lieutenant colonel) and appointed senior chaplain of a corps. On 30 September 1918, he relinquished the appointment of senior chaplain to a corps, and reverted to the rank of temporary Chaplain to the Forces 4th Class. He continued to serve in the army until 1919; he then relinquished his commission and thereby ending his military service.

He became Superior of the Community of the Resurrection in 1922, serving until 1940. On 2 July 1920, he was also appointed one of the chaplains to King George V. He continued as chaplain to Edward VIII and to George VI; he stepped down from the post in 1945.

He died on 21 October 1949; he never married.
