= Mark Nye =

Mark Nye may refer to:

- Mark Nye (bishop)
- Mark Nye (politician)
