= Mark Nye (bishop) =

Anglican bishop and political prisoner in South Africa

The Rt Revd Mark Nye
- Suffragan Bishop of Pretoria
- Church: Anglican
- Province: Southern Africa
- Diocese: Pretoria

Orders
- Ordination: 23 December 1934
- Consecration: 19 June 1973

Personal details
- Born: 1909/02/27 Putney, England
- Died: 18 February 1993 Cape Town
- Denomination: Anglican Christian
- Parents: Charles, Florence
- Spouse: Gabrielle Jacqueline Wanner
- Children: David, Pierre, Claire, Judith
- Education: St. John's College, Oxford

Mark Nye (1909–1993) was an Anglican bishop and political prisoner in South Africa during the apartheid era.

== Education ==
Nye attended the Merchant Taylors' School, Northwood in London after which he went up to St. John's College, Oxford, where he was awarded the Andrew Scholarship 11 June 1928. He did his theological training at Cuddesdon College.

== Clerical career ==
Nye was made deacon on 17 December 1933 and ordained priest 23 December 1934. He served a curacy at St Luke's Church, Kew, 1933-1937. Nye moved to South Africa and served as rector in three parishes in the Diocese of Kimberley and Kuruman in the period 1937 to 1951. In 1951 Nye moved to the Diocese of Pretoria and was a priest in charge of the Pretoria Native Mission in Lady Selbourne but based at St Augustine's Church in the Pretoria city center. Later he was rector of St Wilfred's, Pretoria. In 1965 he was appointed as Dean of Pretoria at St Alban's Cathedral. In 1973 he was consecrated as a bishop and served as suffragan bishop of Pretoria, rector of Christ Church, Pietersburg (now Polokwane and part of the Diocese of St Mark the Evangelist ) and as archdeacon. He retired to Cape Town in 1978, where he continued his priestly ministry until 1987. He died 18 February 1993.

Of particular significance was his long-standing friendship with Canon John Tsebe. Nye invited Tsebe to baptise his younger son, Pierre. This event took place during Bishop Mark Nye's tenure in the Diocese of Pretoria. During this period, Mark Nye worked closely with African clergy to integrate the church and challenge the racial barriers of the time. Having an African priest like John Tsebe perform the baptism of a white Bishop’s son was a significant act of ecclesiastical and social solidarity within the Anglican Church during the apartheid era. It served as a practical demonstration of the "indigenous leadership" and racial equality that Mark Nye championed. Tsebe had been Nye's best man at his wedding and marriage to Gabrielle. Being asked to baptise one of his children deepened the personal and spiritual bond between the Nye family and John Tsebe. John Tsebe was not only a colleague to Bishop Nye but a trusted figure within the family's spiritual life. This connection is often cited in the history of the Diocese of Pretoria as an example of the cross-racial fellowships that existed within the Anglican community despite the political climate of South Africa at the time.

Tsebe was also invited to be godfather to Nye's daughter Claire. In a powerful reversal of the social norms of the time, Reverend John Tsebe was indeed the godfather to Claire Nye Hunter. This relationship was more than just a family friendship; it was a deliberate and courageous statement of non-racialism within the Anglican Church during the height of apartheid. In the mid-20th century South African context, the choice of a Black godfather for a white child was both a powerful Christian witness to the gospel of Christ, and also a radical act which flew in the face of the state's racial laws. By asking John Tsebe to be Claire’s godfather, Bishop Mark Nye and his wife Gabrielle were practically applying their theological belief that all are equal in the eyes of God. As her godfather, John Tsebe was responsible for Claire's spiritual upbringing alongside her parents. This created a lifelong bond between the Tsebe and Nye families that transcended the segregated society of the time. It was a bond that continued until the death of Tsebe. This connection is frequently highlighted in South African church history as a "living example" of the Umzimba ka Kristu (the Body of Christ) operating outside the constraints of the Group Areas Act and other discriminatory policies. The relationship between John Tsebe and the Nye children (Pierre and Claire) illustrates the unique atmosphere of the Diocese of Pretoria during Mark Nye's time there. The clergy did not just work together; they lived out a vision of a shared future.

== Political imprisonment ==
During the 1956 Treason Trial Nye and his family were living in the priest's house of St Augustine's Church, the house was diagonally opposite the Supreme Court (Old Synagogue). (Note: Old Synagogue 25°44′33″S 28°11′17″E) The Treason Trialists would take their meals at the family home.

Following the Sharpeville massacre Nye was detained without trial under the Public Safety Act, 1953, he was arrested on 28 March 1960 (along with Colin Lang, John Brink and Leon Levy, Vuyisile Mini); he was held in solitary confinement for about two months. Nye was released on 31 May 1960.

== Family life ==
Nye's parents were Charles and Florence, his siblings were Margaret, David, Noelle, Mark, Rene, and Niel. Nye married Gabrielle Jacqueline Wanner on 26 April 1954 and they had four children David, Pierre, Claire, Judith. Claire is an Anglican priest.
