= Vuyisile Mini =

- Born: 8 April 1920; Tsomo, Transkei, South Africa
- Died: 6 November 1964 (aged 44) Pretoria Central Prison, Pretoria, South Africa
- Occupations: Trade unionist, activist, singer

Vuyisile Mini (8 April 1920 – 6 November 1964) was a trade unionist, Umkhonto we Sizwe activist, singer and one of the first African National Congress members to be executed by apartheid South Africa.

== Early life ==
Mini was born in 1920 in Tsomo in rural Transkei. Mini's father who was born in Tsomo and later moved to Port Elizabeth as a young man was a Port Elizabeth dockworker active in labour and community struggles, which inspired Mini, at 17, to take part in bus fare and rent increase protests. He was also active in campaigns against forced removals of Black people from Korsten (where he lived) to Kwazakhele. After completing elementary school, he worked as a labourer and trade union organiser.

== Trade union career ==
His union comrades knew Mini as the "organizer of the unorganized", because of his courage and tireless efforts to organize workers across Eastern Cape during the increasingly repressive 1950s. Mini was tasked by the South African Congress of Trade Unions (SACTU) to organize the metal workers and he subsequently became the Metal Workers' Union Secretary. Together with another activist, Stephen Tobia, they founded the African Painting and Building Union. He was also a founding member of the Port Elizabeth Stevedoring and Dockworkers Union, which embarked in the 1950s on one of the longest protests for a wage increase, and fought against the use of convicts for strike breaking.

== Activism ==
Mini's militant political activities began in 1951 when he joined the African National Congress. In 1952 he was jailed with Govan Mbeki and Raymond Mhlaba for three months in Rooi Hel ('Red Hell' or North End Prison, Port Elizabeth) for participation in the 'Campaign of Defiance against Unjust Laws' (Defiance Campaign). He intentionally entered railway property reserved for Whites only, and because of his imprisonment, lost his job as a packer in a battery factory.

On his release he married his trade union work with political activism, rose rapidly in the ranks of the ANC and was elected secretary of the ANC Cape region. In 1956 Mini was one of 156 defendants in the famous Treason Trial. The state's case collapsed for lack of evidence and Mini was discharged on 20 April 1959. In 1960 he became secretary of the Eastern Cape branch of SACTU, a target of repression.

He was arrested and detained along with Govan Mbeki, Temba Mqota, Raymond Mhlaba, J Makgatho, F Matomela, Alvin Bennie, Frances Baard, Norman Ntshinga, V Bisset, S Ndzube, Father Mark Nye, H Stanton, Dr Colin Lang, John Brink, Chief Albert Luthuli, Peter Tsele, Titus Maimela, Samuel Maimela, Peter Brown, Dr Hans Meidner, Dr G M Naicker, M P Naicker [Durban editor of New Age], Helen Joseph, and many others under the State of Emergency declared under the Public Safety Act on 30 March 1960.

In 1961, Mini was one of the first group of people to be recruited into uMkhonto we Sizwe (MK), and become a member of the Eastern Cape High Command. Mini was arrested on 10 May 1963 together with two other prominent ANC members, Wilson Khayinga and Zinakile Mkaba. They were charged with 17 counts of sabotage and other political crimes including complicity in the January 1963 death of Sipho Mange, an alleged police informer.

== Death sentence ==
In March 1964 the three were sentenced to death. This provoked an international outcry, and clemency appeals by President Nasser of the United Arab Republic, on behalf of the Non-aligned States, and by Secretary-General U Thant of the United Nations were unsuccessful. So too were approaches by the UN Special Committee on Apartheid and the UN Security Council. Mini, Wilson Khayinga and Zinakile Mkaba were hanged in the Pretoria Central Prison on 6 November 1964. Mini went to the gallows singing freedom songs, some he had composed. In a spirit of defiance, Mini made a death row statement after an approach by security police to get him to bear witness against comrades.

Ben Turok, a previous co-accused of Mini's in the 1956 Treason Trial, was serving a three-year term in Pretoria prison for MK activities at the time of Mini's execution. He recalled the last moments of Mini (44), Khayinga (38) and Mkaba (35) life in Sechaba, the official ANC journal:

The last evening was devastatingly sad as the heroic occupants of the death cells communicated to the prison in gentle melancholy song that their end was near... It was late at night when the singing ceased, and the prison fell into uneasy silence. I was already awake when the singing began again in the early morning. Once again the excruciatingly beautiful music floated through the barred windows, echoing round the brick exercise yard, losing itself in the vast prison yards. And then, unexpectedly, the voice of Vuyisile Mini came roaring down the hushed passages. Evidently standing on a stool, with his face reaching up to a barred vent in his cell, his unmistakable bass voice was enunciating his final message in Xhosa to the world he was leaving. In a voice charged with emotion but stubbornly defiant he spoke of the struggle waged by the African National Congress and of his absolute conviction of the victory to come. And then it was Khayinga's turn, followed by Mkaba, as they too defied all prison rules to shout out their valedictions. Soon after, I heard the door of their cell being opened. Murmuring voices reached my straining ears, and then the three martyrs broke into a final poignant melody which seemed to fill the whole prison with sound and then gradually faded away into the distant depths of the condemned section.

== Legacy ==
After his 1964 execution, Mini was secretly buried in a pauper's grave at Rebecca Street Cemetery in Pretoria. The bodies of Mini, Khayinga and Mkaba were exhumed in 1998 at Rebecca Street Cemetery in Pretoria and Mini was given a hero's funeral when he was re-interred at the Emlotheni Memorial Park in New Brighton township in Port Elizabeth.

On 27 June 1998, the park was officially opened by Deputy President Thabo Mbeki and the Mayor of Port Elizabeth, Nceba Faku.

On 6 November 2010, Port Elizabeth's Market Square was renamed Vuyisile Mini Square.

The ANC Mission Office in Tanzania opened a Furniture factory that was known as the Vuyisile Mini Factory (VMF).

At the time of his death, Mini was married, and had six children. One of his children, Nomkhosi Mini became a member of MK and survived a March 1979 South African Defence Force attack on the Novo Catengue camp in Angola. She was shot dead by members of the notorious Vlakplaas hit squad when they raided two houses in Maseru, Lesotho on 19 December 1985. Seven members of the Security branch, including its then deputy chief were refused amnesty for this killing.

== Private life ==
Mini was a gifted actor, dancer, poet and singer (he was a member of various groups and a prominent member of the P.E. Male Voice Choir). He is remembered for the songs he composed as well as their delivery in his powerful bass voice, sometimes militant, and at other times nostalgic. His words composed during the Treason Trial, Thath' unthwalo Buti sigoduke balindile umama no bab' ekhaya (Take up your things Brother and let's go, they are waiting, our mothers and fathers, at home), came to take on new associations as the forced relocation scheme of apartheid made Black people refugees in the land of their birth. He is remembered for composing one of the most popular liberation songs of the 1950s, Pasopa nantsi 'ndondemnyama we Verwoerd, (Look out, Verwoerd, here are the Black people).

== See also ==
- Amandla!: A Revolution in Four-Part Harmony
