= Edward Talbot (bishop) =

English Anglican bishop (1844–1934)

The Right Reverend Edward Talbot
- Bishop of Winchester
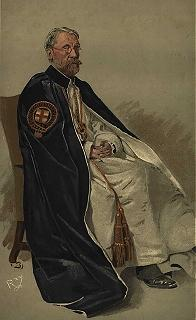
- Talbot in Vanity Fair magazine, 11 October 1911
- Church: Church of England
- Diocese: Winchester
- Elected: 1911
- Predecessor: Herbert Ryle
- Successor: Theodore Woods
- Other posts: Bishop of Southwark; 1905–1911; Bishop of Rochester; 1895–1905

Orders
- Consecration: c. 1895

Personal details
- Born: 19 February 1844
- Died: 30 January 1934 (aged 89)
- Buried: Outside Winchester Cathedral
- Denomination: Anglican
- Residence: Farnham Castle
- Parents: John Chetwynd-Talbot & Caroline Stuart-Wortley
- Spouse: Lavinia Lyttelton
- Children: see below
- Education: Christ Church, Oxford

Edward Stuart Talbot (19 February 1844 – 30 January 1934) was an Anglican bishop in the Church of England and the first Warden of Keble College, Oxford. He was successively the Bishop of Rochester, the Bishop of Southwark and the Bishop of Winchester.

When the First World War started in August 1914, it was a surprise to many including Bishop Talbot who, in January 1914, had written, "No year has opened with greater anxieties. It is true, thank God, that the black cloud which at the opening of 1912 hung over our relations with Germany, threatening war, has greatly lightened and dispersed." He was in no doubt in August 1914 that it would be an horrific war. "It is a sober truth that in its scale, in the numbers whom it will touch, in the amount of suffering which it may cause, there has been nothing like it in the history of Europe." He quoted the support given to Britain "by our Colonies, by the main body of American opinion, and by public feeling in Italy, all of them in a degree independent witnesses", as indicative of the righteousness of the British cause fighting "for freedom". He was very busy during the war, attending various meetings, encouraging women to take on war work, creating a Roll of Honour of clergy and clergy families who had volunteered for the Forces and chairing an "Enquiry into Religion in the Army". He himself was a strong preacher with a resonant voice and, at well over six feet in height, he looked and sounded like an ideal bishop.

Talbot's two elder brothers went to France in August 1914, as Temporary Chaplains to the Forces (TCF). Both were awarded the Military Cross. His youngest son, Gilbert, was killed in action. "It has pleased God that Gilbert should be taken....", he remarked.

== Education ==
He was educated at Charterhouse School until 1858. In 1862 he went up to Christ Church, Oxford, and graduated in 1865. He remained there until 1869 as modern history tutor.

== Career ==
In 1869 he was appointed first warden of Keble College, Oxford, and he stayed there until 1888 when he accepted the post of Vicar of Leeds Parish Church, where he remained for six years (1889–1895). While still in Oxford he and his wife Lavinia were the founders of Lady Margaret Hall, the first college for women, in 1878. He then held the posts of Bishops of Rochester, of Southwark and of Winchester. He was canonically elected to the See of Winchester on 19 April 1911 at Winchester Cathedral and that election was confirmed (by which Talbot took the See) on 1 May 1911 at St Mary-le-Bow. Farnham Castle was the traditional home of the Bishops of Winchester.

== Family ==
His father was the Hon. John Chetwynd-Talbot, son of Charles Chetwynd-Talbot, 2nd Earl Talbot, and his mother was Caroline Jane Stuart-Wortley, daughter of James Stuart-Wortley, 1st Baron Wharncliffe.

He married the Hon. Lavinia Lyttelton (born 10 October 1849), daughter of George Lyttelton, 4th Baron Lyttelton and Mary née Glynne, on 29 June 1870. Their children were:

- Mary Catherine Talbot (2 October 1875 – 2 September 1957) who married Lionel Ford
- Revd Edward Keble Talbot (31 December 1877 – 21 October 1949)
- Rt Revd Neville Stuart Talbot, Bishop of Pretoria (21 August 1879 – 3 April 1943)
- Lavinia Caroline Talbot (15 April 1882 – 30 September 1950)
- Gilbert Walter Lyttelton Talbot (1 September 1891 – 30 July 1915, killed in action at Ypres), and after whom the Toc H organisation was named
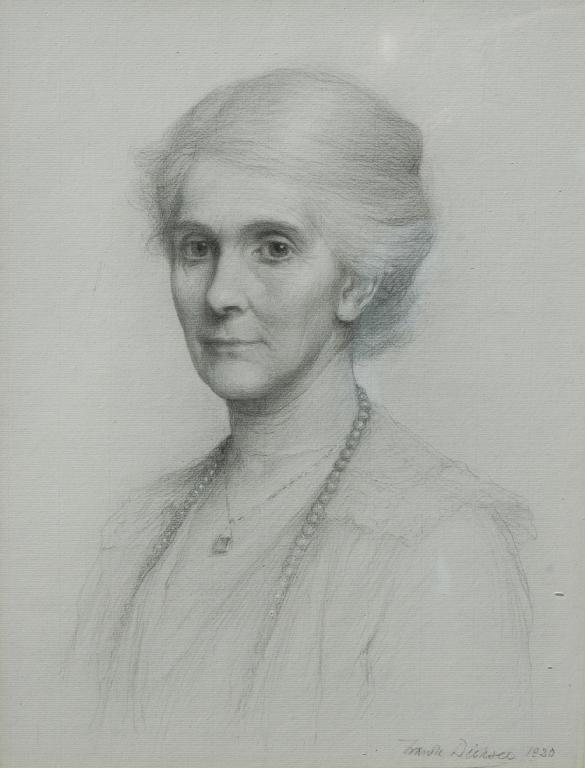
Hon. Lavinia Lyttelton (Talbot's wife; 1920) by Frank Bernard Dicksee

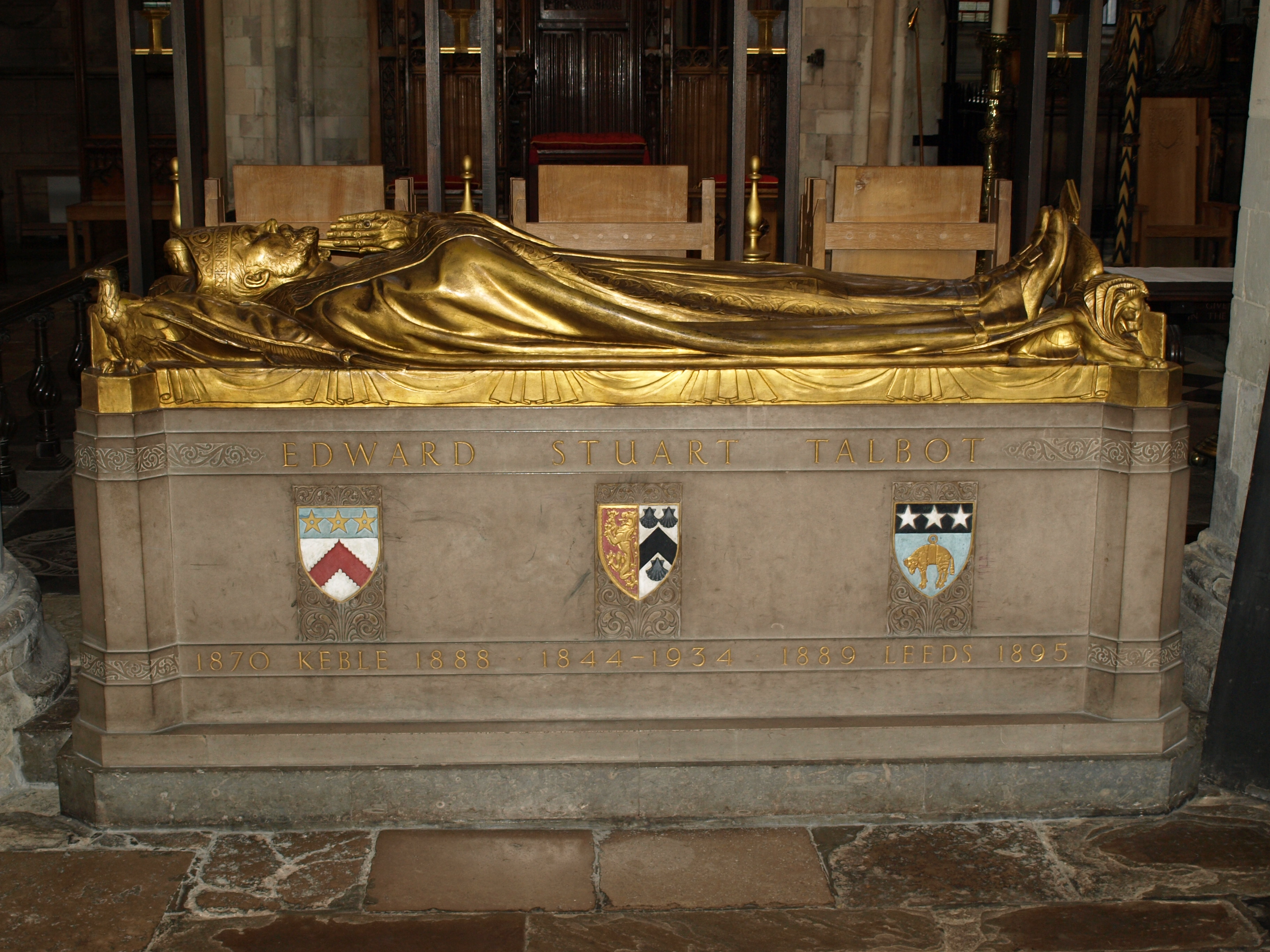
Monument to Edward Stuart Talbot in Southwark Cathedral

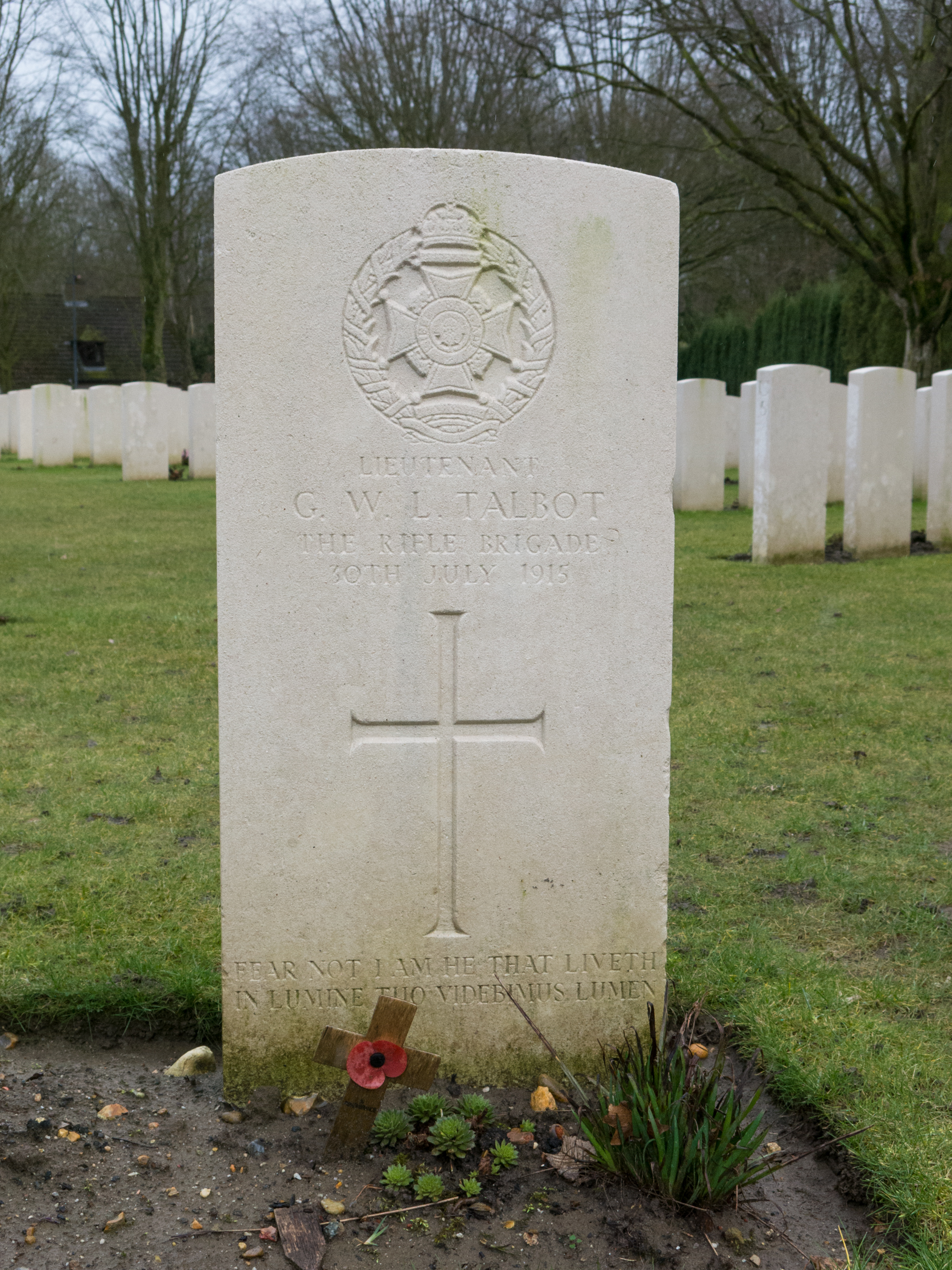
Gravestone of Talbot's youngest son Gilbert

== Works ==
He wrote the following books:

- Influence of Christianity on Slavery (1867)
- The War and Conscience
- The Spiritual Sanctions of a League of Nations
- Memories of Early Life (1925)

== Legacy ==
The Hall and one face of the Wolfson quadrangle of Lady Margaret Hall was named the Talbot Building after him: it was opened in 1910.

The Talbot Fund at Keble College, established in 1999, also bears his name.

A memorial to Talbot stands in Southwark Cathedral in the form of a bronze effigy on top of a stone tomb, by sculptor Cecil Thomas.

== Sources ==
- Dictionary of National Biography

Academic offices
Preceded by Inaugural appointment	Warden of Keble College, Oxford; 1870-1888	Succeeded by Robert Wilson
Church of England titles
Preceded by Randall Davidson	Bishop of Rochester; 1895–1905	Succeeded by John Harmer
New diocese	Bishop of Southwark; 1905–1911	Succeeded by Hubert Burge
Preceded by Herbert Ryle	Bishop of Winchester; 1911–1923	Succeeded by Theodore Woods
