= Johannes Seoka =

South African bishop

The Right Reverend Johannes Seoka
- Bishop of Pretoria
- Church: Anglican
- See: Anglican Diocese of Pretoria
- In office: 1998–2015
- Predecessor: Richard Kraft
- Successor: Allen Kannemeyer
- Previous post: Dean of Pretoria

Orders
- Ordination: 1975
- Consecration: 1998

Personal details
- Born: August 29, 1948 (age 77)

Johannes Thomas Seoka (born 29 August 1948) is a retired South African Anglican bishop. He was the Bishop of Pretoria from 1998 to 2015.

Seoka studied at Eshowe College of Education in Zululand and at the University of Chicago, in the United States. He studied for the Anglican priesthood at St Bede’s College, Umtata, and was ordained in 1975. He was a curate at St Augustine's, in Umlazi, and then rector of St Peter's, in Greytown. After further incumbencies both in South Africa and Chicago, he was appointed Dean of Pretoria in 1996. He was elected its bishop in 1998, a post he held until 2015.

A traditionalist, he represented the Anglican Church of Southern Africa at the Global South encounters which took place in Singapore, in April 2010, and in Bangkok, Thailand, in July 2012. He was one of the signants, on behalf of Archbishop Thabo Makgoba, of the Global South Primates letter to the Crown Nominations Commission of the new Archbishop of Canterbury, on 20 July 2012.

Seoka was exonerated by an investigatory committee of misconduct, in October 2012, of the charges made by members of the Cathedral of St. Alban the Martyr that he had stolen 500,000 rands of diocesan trust funds.

Seoka has been prominent in his support for the victims of the Marikana Massacre.
