= John Ruston (bishop) =

English CoE bishop (1934-2010)

John Harry Gerald Ruston OGS (1 October 1934 - 27 April 2010) was the 13th Bishop of St Helena from 1991 to 1999. He was previously Bishop Suffragan of Pretoria.

== Early life ==
Ruston was born 1 October 1934 and grew up at Berkhamsted, Hertfordshire, where he was associated with the Parish of St Michael and All Angels, Sunnyside, before, during and just after World War II.

== Education and early career ==
Ruston studied at Sidney Sussex College, Cambridge University, where he graduated with a Bachelor of Arts degree in 1952 and a Master of Arts degree in 1956. He also attended Ely Theological College in 1952.

Ruston was ordained a deacon in 1954 and a priest in 1955 in the Diocese of Leicester where he served a curacy at St Andrew's Leicester from 1954 to 1957. He furthered his theological studies at Cuddesdon, where he was also a tutor, from 1957 to 1961.

== South Africa ==
Going to South Africa, Ruston was curate of Sekhukhuneland from 1967 to 1970, serving simultaneously as principal of St Francis’ College in Sekhukhuneland. Also from 1967 he served as an examining chaplain to the Bishop of Pretoria, a role he fulfilled until 1976. In 1971 he became the sub-dean at St Alban's Cathedral, Pretoria, of which he was a canon from 1968 to 1976.

In 1976 Ruston took up an appointment as Archdeacon of Bloemfontein and as an examining chaplain to the Bishop of Bloemfontein and warden and chaplain of St Michael's School, Bloemfontein.

== Pretoria and Pietersburg ==
Ruston was ordained to the episcopacy as Bishop Suffragan of Pretoria, being sent to oversee the Archdeaconry of the North centred on Pietersburg (now Polokwane). Under his leadership a new diocese, the Diocese of St Mark the Evangelist, was formed and inaugurated on 16 May 1987; initially, he served the new diocese as vicar-general, and remained Suffragan of the old until 1991.

== St Helena ==
In 1991, Ruston was elected as the 13th Bishop of St Helena and was enthroned on the island at the Cathedral Church of St Paul on 14 April 1991.

Ruston founded the British Citizenship Commission (St Helena) for the promotion of "restoration of full rights of citizenship of those British subjects who are Saint Helenian."

He served on the island until 1999 when he was succeeded by John Salt.

== Retirement ==
In retirement, Ruston returned to South Africa after a brief visit to England and worked at Bot River, Bella Vista and Kenilworth in the Diocese of Cape Town.

He subsequently settled back in England, where he died on 27 April 2010. A Requiem Mass was held on 18 May 2010 at the College of St Barnabas, Lingfield, Surrey. He was 75 years old.
