= Association for the Education of Women =

Educational association at Oxford University

- Formation: 1878
- Dissolved: 1920
- Type: Educational
- Purpose: Promoting women's education at Oxford
- Headquarters: Clarendon Building
- Location: Broad Street, Oxford, England
- Affiliations: University of Oxford

The Association for the Education of Women or Association for Promoting the Higher Education of Women in Oxford (AEW) was formed in 1878 to promote the education of women at the University of Oxford. It provided lectures and tutorials for students at the four women's halls in Oxford, as well as for female students living at home or in lodgings and was dissolved in 1920 when women were admitted as members of the university.

== History ==
in 1873 a Lectures for Women Committee was set up by a group of Oxford women, including the "don's wives" Louise Creighton, Charlotte Byron Green, Bertha Johnson, Lavinia Talbot and Mary Ward who were later involved in the AEW. The lectures started in 1874 and were given by university academics such as Arthur Johnson, William Stubbs and Henry Nettleship.

The association was formed at a meeting at Jesus College in 1878 and G G Bradley, the Master of University College, Oxford was chosen as the first chairman.

It was realised that a new hall in Oxford was required where women students could live whilst at university. The consensus was split on religious grounds: some wanted a hall which ignored a woman's denomination, whilst others like Lavinia Talbot supported a hall for Anglo Catholics. The first women's halls at the university, the Anglican Lady Margaret Hall and the denomination free Somerville Hall, opened in 1879. Two further women's halls were St Hugh's Hall, founded by Elizabeth Wordsworth in 1886, and St Hilda's Hall, founded by Dorothea Beale in 1893.

A number of non-resident students also enrolled in 1879 and were supervised by the Lady Secretary of the AEW until a principal was appointed in 1893. The AEW was their parent organisation until 1910. The term Home-Students was used from 1891 and Society of Oxford Home-Students from 1898. The society received a royal charter as St Anne's College in 1952.

The AEW organised lectures and tutorials for female students at all the women's halls. At first lectures were held in rooms above a baker’s shop in Little Clarendon Street and later in a former Baptist Chapel in Alfred Street (now Pusey Street). From 1880 women students began to be admitted to lectures at the men's colleges.

The halls were originally intended to be hostels, leaving teaching to the AEW. However they gradually started to employ their own tutors, starting at Somerville with Lilla Haigh in 1882 and at LMH with Eleanor Lodge in 1895. A dispute with Somerville over the appointment of tutors led to the resignation of Bertha Johnson as Lady Secretary of the AEW in 1894.

Examinations were initially administered by the Delegacy for Local Examinations: at first female students took the delegacy’s certificate for women over 18, but from 1884 they could take the university's honours examination papers, starting with classics, mathematics, modern history and natural science. In 1910 the University set up a Delegacy for Women Students, for the first time officially recognising their existence and allowing them to take university exams. The delegacy took over the registration of women students and their entry for examinations from the AEW, as well as the supervision of the Society of Oxford Home-Students.

In 1895 Henry Nettleship's widow Matilda donated his library to the AEW where it formed a shared collection for all women students, based in the attics of the Clarendon Building. It later became the library of the Society of Oxford Home-Students.

In 1920 women were allowed to become members of the university and receive degrees. The first matriculation ceremony was on 7 October 1920 and the first degrees were awarded on 14 October 1920. The AEW was wound up in 1920, followed in 1921 by the Delegacy for Women Students.

The women honorary secretaries of the AEW were: Charlotte Byron Green (1880–1883), Bertha Johnson (1883–1894) and Annie Rogers (1894–1920).
