= Andrew Weinstein =

Revd. Andrew J. Weinstein (Kiev, 1 May 1850 - 14 December 1915) was a British Anglican priest, deacon, diocesan chaplain and missionary.

Weinstein was born in Kiev, Russian Empire in a Jewish family, Yiddish was the first language he learned.

He was baptized as a Christian in 1870 while studying at a French college in Beirut. He graduated from King's College London in 1888 and was ordained deacon and became a missionary of the London Jews' Society (now CMJ). He was curator at St Andrew Undershaft (1890–93) and completed his studies at University College. In 1894 he traveled to South Africa and served as curator at St. James Church, Natal and was also rector at Christ Church, Polokwane, he also served churches in Vryburg and Dundee, KwaZulu-Natal. In 1907 he moved to New York and then went to Washington, where he served the Church of Our Savior as chaplain in 1908. In 1909 he went to Philadelphia and continued his work at St. Peter's Church and also served as a port chaplain until the day of his death.

== Literature ==
St. Peter's Church: Faith in Action for 250 Years Hardcover – Cordelia F. Biddle, Elizabeth S Brown, Alan J. Heavens and Charles P. Peitz (October 14, 2011 - Temple University Press, Philadelphia. - pp. 129–137
