= St Mark's College, Jane Furse =

St. Mark's College is a high school in the town of Jane Furse in Limpopo Province, South Africa. The school was founded by the brothers of the Community of the Resurrection in the first half of the twentieth century, it is no longer an Anglican church school, but rather a public school on private property. The school's governing council is chaired by the bishop of the Diocese of St Mark the Evangelist.

== Notes and references ==
- Mathabatha, Sello (2005). "Missionary schools, student uprisings in Lebowa and the Sekhukhuneland students' revolts, 1983–1986". African Studies. 64 (2): 263–284. doi:10.1080/00020180500355827. ISSN 0002-0184. S2CID 144488078. – via Taylor & Francis (subscription required)
