= Delegacy for Women Students =

Educational association at Oxford University

- Formation: November 1, 1910
- Dissolved: 1921
- Type: Educational
- Purpose: Governing women's education at Oxford University
- Headquarters: Clarendon Building
- Location: Broad Street, Oxford, England
- Affiliations: University of Oxford

The Delegacy for Women Students was a committee formed by the University of Oxford which oversaw the governance of Oxford's women students and colleges. It marked the first time Oxford officially recognised the existence of women students.

The idea of the Delegacy came from Henry T. Gerrans, secretary of the Delegacy for Local Examinations, who suggested to the Hebdomadal Council that the university should formally assume supervision and responsibility over women students who had been attending Oxford since 1878. On 1 November 1910, a statute was passed which established the Delegacy, for the first time acknowledging women students to be members of the university and also officially recognising the five women's colleges: St Hilda's College, St Hugh's College, Somerville College, Lady Margaret Hall and the Society of Oxford Home-Students.

The statute had a total of thirteen resolutions, many of which listed the duties and role of the delegacy. Those included:

- Assumption of control over the Society of Oxford Home-Students (later St Anne's College).
- Overseeing the registration and keeping a register of female students.
- Approval any new educational institute for women and control over any collegiate and non-collegiate lodgings for female students.
- Conducting examinations of students.

Many of the Delegacy's roles were transferred from the Association for the Education of Women (AEW) and the Delegacy of Local Examinations. Its headquarters were located in the basement of the Clarendon Building where it operated alongside the AEW until 1920, when the latter was wound up after the admittance of women as full-time members of Oxford. The following year, the Delegacy was also wound up as the university took its responsibilities.

== See also ==
- First women admitted to degrees at the University of Oxford
