= John Addington Symonds (physician) =

English physician and author

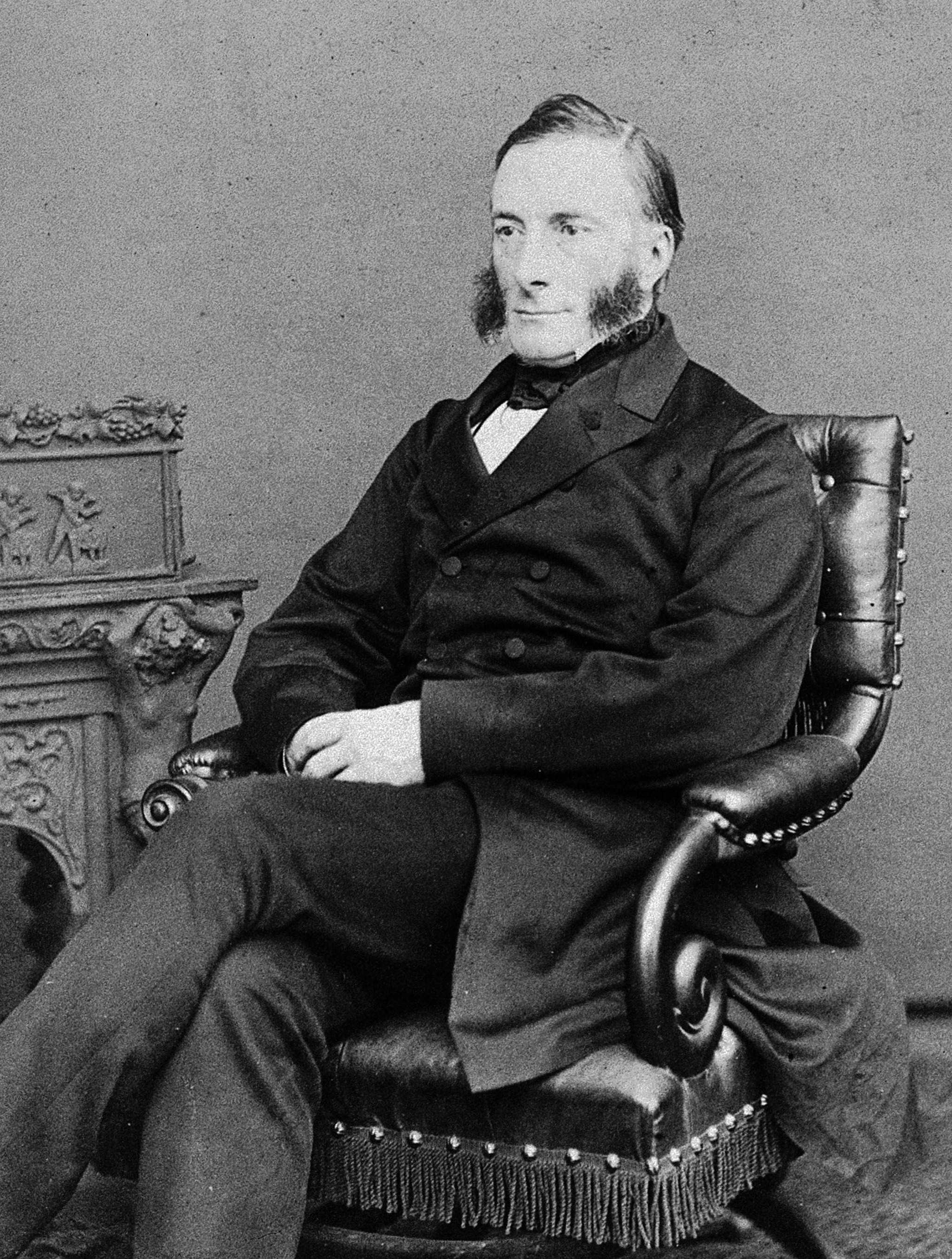
- John Addington Symonds in 1867
- Born: 10 April 1807; Oxford, England
- Died: 25 February 1871 (aged 63)
- Education: Magdalen College School
- Alma mater: University of Edinburgh
- Occupation: Physician
- Spouse: Harriet Sykes (m. 1834; died 1844)
- Children: John, Charlotte, and 3 others
- Parents: John Symonds (father); Mary Williams (mother)
- Relatives: John Addington Symonds (son); Charlotte Byron Symonds (daughter); Sir Charles Cave, 1st Baronet (son-in-law)

John Addington Symonds (10 April 1807 – 25 February 1871) was an English physician and writer.

== Life ==
He was born in Oxford, where his father John Symonds was a medical practitioner. His mother was Mary Williams, of Aston, Oxfordshire. Symonds was educated at Magdalen College School; at the age of sixteen he went to the University of Edinburgh for medical training, and graduated M.D. in 1828.

Returning to Oxford, Symonds began the practice of his profession as assistant to his father. In 1831 he moved to Bristol, where he was soon appointed physician to the general hospital, and lectured on forensic medicine at the Bristol medical school. He exchanged in 1836 for the lectureship on the practice of medicine, which he held till 1845. He retired from active service on the hospital staff in 1848. In 1853 he was elected an associate of the Royal College of Physicians, and in 1857 a Fellow. In 1859 he secretly forced Charles Vaughn to resign as headmaster of Harrow School, after learning about the latter's affair with a pupil.

In the autumn of 1868 his health began to fail. In 1869 he delivered an address on health when presiding over the health section of the Social Science Association at the meeting at Clifton. He finally abandoned practice early in 1870, and died on 25 February 1871. Thomas Woolner sculpted a bust of Symonds.

== Works ==
In his early years at Bristol Symonds contributed to the Cyclopædia of Practical Medicine, the British and Foreign Medical Review, and other professional periodicals. A close friend of James Cowles Prichard, Symonds in an essay on Criminal Responsibility, published in 1869, supported Prichard's opinions as to the existence of a condition of moral insanity. He also devoted attention to the relations of mind and muscles, and to the phenomena of dreams and sleep, analysing the interaction of memory, association, and imagination in the formation of dreams.

Symonds prepared in 1849 a life of his friend Prichard for the Bath and Bristol branch of the Provincial Medical and Surgical Association (printed in their Journal, 1850, vol. ii.), and published lectures and essays in separate volumes, including:

- Knowledge: an introductory address, London and Bristol, 1846.
- Sleep and Dreams: two lectures delivered at the Bristol Literary and Philosophical Institution, London, 1851; 2nd ed. 1857.
- The Principles of Beauty, London, 1857.
- Ten Years: an inaugural lecture delivered at the Bristol Institution for the Advancement of Science, London, 1861.

A collected edition of his essays, with some occasional verses and a memoir by his son, appeared under the title of Miscellanies in 1871.

== Family ==
In 1834 he married Harriet Sykes, eldest daughter of James Sykes of Leatherhead. She died in 1844. They had five children, one of whom was John Addington Symonds the poet and literary critic (1840–1893). Their daughter, the education promoter, Charlotte Byron Green married Thomas Hill Green the philosopher.
