= Richard Fenwick (bishop) =

Anglican bishop (born 1943)

The Right Reverend Richard Fenwick
- Bishop of St Helena
- Church: Anglican Church of Southern Africa
- Diocese: Diocese of St Helena
- In office: 2011–2018
- Predecessor: John Salt
- Successor: Dale Bowers

Orders
- Ordination: 1969
- Consecration: 2011

Personal details
- Born: 3 December 1943 (age 82)
- Denomination: Anglicanism

Richard David Fenwick OStJ (born 3 December 1943) is an Anglican prelate, and was Bishop of St Helena from 2011 to 2018.

== Early life ==
Fewnwick was born on 3 December 1943 to Ethel May Fenwick and William Samuel Fenwick. He was educated at Glantaf School, a Welsh medium state school in Llandaff North, at Monkton House, a private school in Cardiff, and Cantonian High School, a state school in Fairwater, Cardiff. He then studied at University of Wales, Lampeter (BA, MA, PhD), Trinity College, Dublin (B.Mus, MA), Fitzwilliam College, Cambridge, Ridley Hall, Cambridge.

== Clerical career ==
Fenwick was made deacon in 1968 and ordained priest in 1969, he was consecrated bishop in 2011.

He was assistant curate at Skewen from 1968 to 1972 and at Penarth with Lavernock 1972–1974.

Fenwick moved to England and was priest-vicar, succentor and sacrist of Rochester Cathedral from 1974 to 1978. At St Paul's Cathedral he was a minor canon 1978–83, succentor 1979-83 and warden of the College of Minor Canons 1981–83. Fenwick was vicar at St Martin's Church, Ruislip 1983-90 and priest-vicar of Westminster Abbey 1983–90. At Guildford Cathedral he was canon residentiary and precentor 1990-97 and sub-dean from 1996–97;

He returned to Wales as Dean of Monmouth 1997–2011. In 2011 he was elected as Bishop of St Helena, a diocese of the Anglican Church of Southern Africa. In 2018 he was succeeded by Dale Bowers, who was consecrated at St Paul's Cathedral on the island.

== Awards and honours ==
He received the Archbishop of Wales's Award in Church Music (Honoris causa) in 2012. He was warden of the Guild of Church Musicians 1998–2011; Liveryman in the Worshipful Company of Musicians, Honorary Liveryman and Master's Chaplain in the Worshipful Company of Gold and Silver Wyre Drawers 1981–2011;

He received an honorary D.Litt. from Central School of Religion in 2012. In 2001 he was appointed a Brother Officer in the Venerable Order of St John (OStJ).

== Notes and references ==
- "The Rt Rev the Lord Bishop of St Helena Authorised Biography". Debrett's People of Today. Archived from the original on 10 November 2014.
- "Dean of Monmouth becomes South Atlantic bishop". South Wales Argus. 16 February 2011.
- "Welsh dean appointed African bishop". The Church of England Newspaper. 4 March 2011. p. 5.

Church in Wales titles
Preceded by Gareth Lewis	Dean of Monmouth; 1997–2011	Succeeded by Jeremy Winston
Anglican Church of Southern Africa titles
Preceded by John Salt	Bishop of St Helena; 2011–2018	Succeeded by Dale Bowers
