= Neville Talbot =

British Anglican bishop (1879–1943)

The Right Reverend Neville Talbot MC
- Bishop of Pretoria
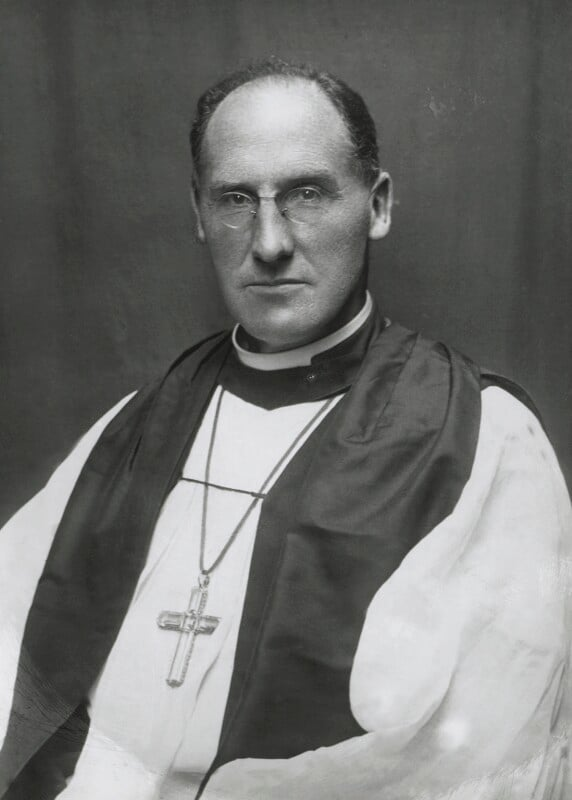
- Talbot in the 1920s
- Church: Anglican
- Province: Southern Africa
- Other post: assistant Bishop of Southwell

Orders
- Ordination: 1909
- Consecration: 1920

Personal details
- Born: 21 August 1879
- Died: 3 April 1943 (aged 63)

Neville Stuart Talbot MC (21 August 1879 – 3 April 1943) was Bishop of Pretoria in the Anglican Church of Southern Africa and later a robust vicar of St Mary's Church, Nottingham and assistant Bishop of Southwell who turned down the chance to be Bishop of Croydon. He was born at Keble College, Oxford, and died at Henfield, Sussex.

== Family ==
He was the third child and second son of his parents. His father, Edward Stuart Talbot, a younger son of a younger son of the house of Shrewsbury was the first Warden of Keble College, Oxford, and later Vicar of Leeds, and thereafter successively Bishop of Rochester, Southwark and Winchester. His mother, Lavinia Talbot, was a promoter of women's education.

Neville had two brothers, the elder of whom, Edward, was to join the Community of the Resurrection, and the younger, Gilbert, was to be killed in action in the Ypres Salient in 1915. Of his sisters, Mary married Lionel Ford, the Headmaster of Repton and Harrow and later Dean of York, while Lavinia was, after his wife's death, to keep house for him and bring up his children.

== Schooling ==
When Neville was nine his family moved to Leeds. Neville attended the Grammar School, and then was at Haileybury from 1892 to 1899.

== Military service ==
Talbot joined the Militia on 23 May 1898 as a second lieutenant in the 6th Battalion Rifle Brigade (The Prince Consort's Own). He transferred to a regular army appointment with the 1st battalion on 17 May 1899, shortly before the Second Boer War started later the same year. Military life had an attraction for certain sides of Neville's character. It appealed to a certain simplicity in him and the need for courage. Neville was inclined to go straight at things, without weighing the risk. He blurted out untimely truths. The discipline of the Army did not affect him much. The Boer War was not a very good school for that. Much of it was like a shooting party, and the hazardous self-exposure in the clear air of the veldt remained his first taste of danger. Promoted to lieutenant on 27 June 1900, he stayed in South Africa after the war ended in June 1902, and was in October that year appointed temporary to the staff as aide-de-camp to General Sir Neville Lyttelton, Commanding troops in the South African colonies.

== Education ==
Neville went up to Christ Church, Oxford, in October 1903. While at Oxford, he played one first-class cricket match for Oxford University as a lower-order batsman and opening bowler. In the winter of 1907 he went to Cuddesdon for his ordination training.

== Clerical career ==
Talbot was made deacon at Ripon Cathedral on 14 June 1908. He was an assistant curate at St Bartholomew's Church, Armley, from 1908 to 1909. He was ordained priest in Lent 1909 and went to be Chaplain of Balliol College, Oxford, in October. During the World War I he served as a military chaplain (4th Class), he was later Assistant Chaplain-General to the Fifth Army.

In April 1918 he was married to Cecil Mary Eastwood by his father at West Stoke Church, near Chichester.

=== Pretoria ===
On 12 April 1920 he was elected Bishop of Pretoria, in succession to Bishop Furse. He was consecrated into bishop's orders on St John the Baptist's Day (24 June), by Randall Davidson, Archbishop of Canterbury, at St Paul's Cathedral. Among the bishops who took part in the consecration were his own father, then Bishop of Winchester, the Archbishop of Cape Town, and his predecessor in the Diocese of Pretoria, Bishop Michael Furse.

In 1930 he refused the appointment as Bishop of Newcastle, New South Wales.

=== Nottingham ===
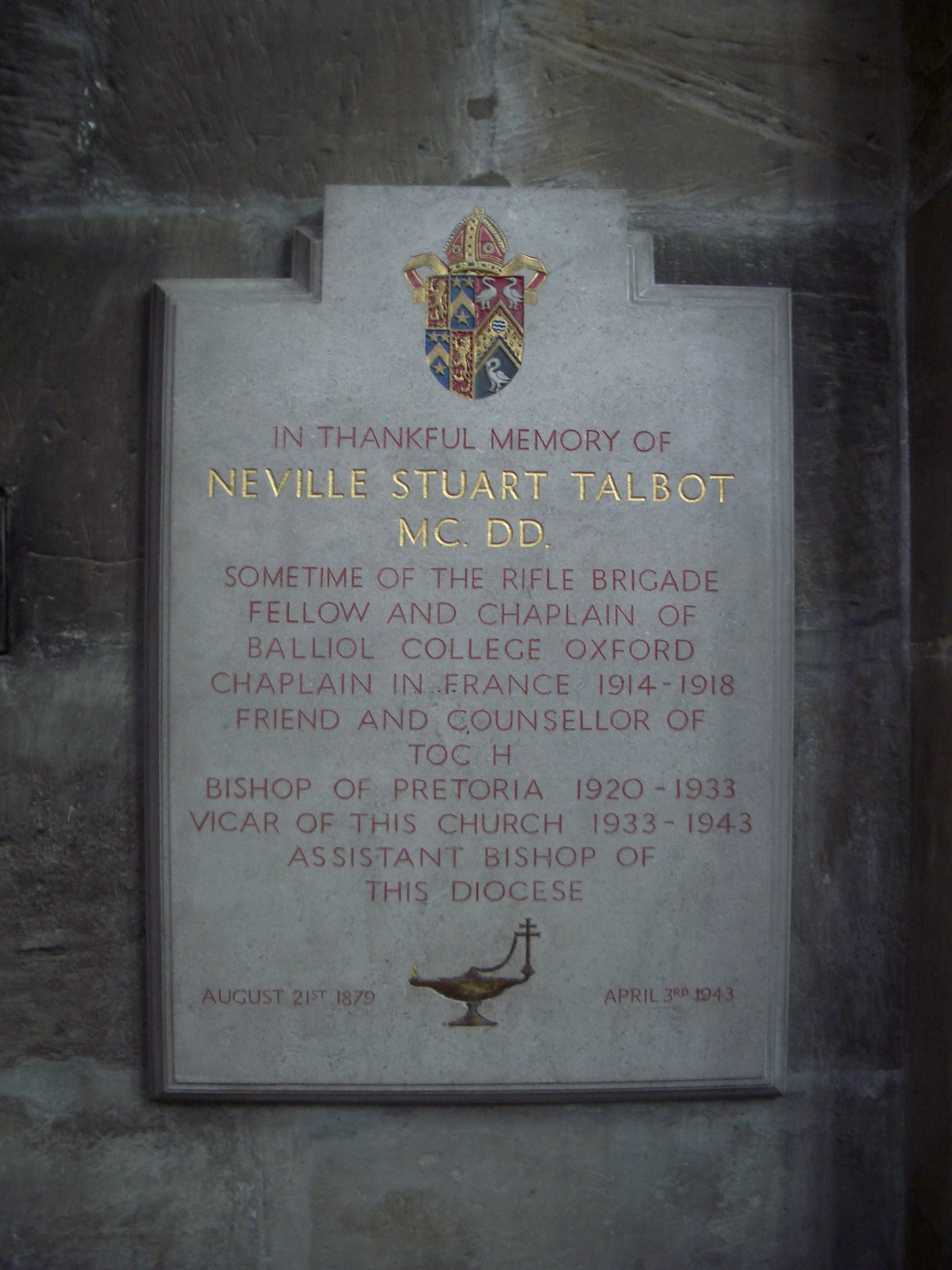
Memorial to Neville Stuart Talbot in the Lady Chapel of St Mary's Church, Nottingham

He was appointed to St Mary's Church, Nottingham in 1933 and as Assistant Bishop of Southwell the next year. Neville used to refer to St Mary's as St Pelican in the Wilderness. This is explained by the comment of a priest in the diocese:

He arrived snuffing like a great war-horse, longing for the battle; determined to bring Nottingham to the feet of Christ. He was not a little handicapped by the fact that he came just when the migration from the city began, with the result that the old-fashioned kind of worshippers had largely moved into the country. This handicap was late accentuated during the war by the difficulties of transport. His congregation did not increase as he had hoped.

The parish was largely non-residential, and the church was surrounded by factories and offices which Neville used to visit carrying handbills announcing the special dinner-hour service.

Neville was in excellent relations with the non-Anglican religious bodies in Nottingham. In co-operation with John Francis McNulty, the Roman Catholic Bishop of Nottingham, and Mr James, the Free Church leader, he helped to create the Nottinghamshire Christian Council, which owed much to the combination in Neville of an outspoken loyalty to his convictions with a warm spirit of fraternity.

In May 1941, Neville wrote from Nottingham :

We had a visitation – nothing compared with some places, but still a very real taste. Began about twelve. We had gone to bed, and tried to believe that the explosions were our guns, but soon one and then another were unmistakable – one was not far off down Friar's Lane. Peering out of the top window, I soon realised that big fires had been started, so, there being a lull, I went down. I found a fire going in the South Transept of the Church. It took a long time really to put it out.

Neville was often restless within the conditions of his restriction in his parish at Nottingham – restrictions greatly increased by the war. He likened himself to "an old hulk stranded on a lee-shore". His fearless honesty made him accuse himself of ambition, but, if it was there, it did not lurk in any secret corner. In March 1939 he was offered the position of Bishop of Croydon. He would have been Suffragan and Archdeacon as well as Vicar. His first feeling was that he must accept. He felt that nine years in Nottingham were enough, and that "the call came from the Church and not from Downing Street." However, after inspecting conditions on the spot, he decided against.

With the coming of the war, there seemed to open out at last the chance for work that suited his gifts. It arose out of his interest in the Royal Air Force . In January 1941, he took a four days' mission for them at Cranwell, and in 1942 he took a mission in the Royal Air Force depot at Donington. Such experiences convinced him that far more was needed on the spiritual side in the Chaplains' department, and he began a long and unwearied bombardment of the authorities (military and ecclesiastical). He visited C. S. Lewis at Magdalen College, Oxford, staying overnight on 5 November 1941 for conversation between two men who were both involved in the RAF, Lewis as a lecturer. In November 1942, the two archbishops wrote to inform him that he had been appointed as one of the seven men that were to give the greater part of the time to visiting Air Force centres. On 9 December he wrote that he was to start on 12 January 1943. However, just when the direction of his life was moving in a direction that would more suitable employ his talents, came the tragic collapse. On 12 December 1942 he had a severe heart-attack, from which he never recovered.

He retired to Sussex for convalescence where he died. He was buried at All Hallows Barking, the religious headquarters of Toc H.

Anglican Church of Southern Africa titles
Preceded by Michael Bolton Furse	Bishop of Pretoria; 1920–1933	Succeeded by Wilfrid Parker
Church of England titles
Preceded by James Geoffrey Gordon	Vicar of StF Mary's Church, Nottingham; 1933–1943	Succeeded by Robert Henry Hawkins
