= John Salt (bishop) =

British Anglican bishop

The Right Reverend John Salt OGS
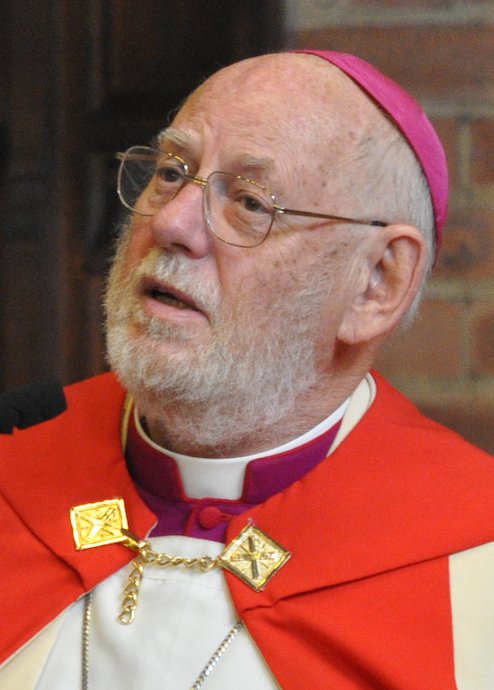
- Church: Anglican Church of Southern Africa
- Diocese: Diocese of St Helena
- In office: 1999–2011
- Predecessor: John Ruston
- Successor: Richard Fenwick

Orders
- Ordination: 1966 (deacon); 1967 (priest)
- Consecration: 1999

Personal details
- Born: 30 October 1941 United Kingdom
- Died: 7 February 2017 (aged 75) Walsingham, Norfolk, England
- Denomination: Anglican
- Education: Kelham Theological College

John William Salt, OGS (30 October 1941 – 7 February 2017) was a British Anglican bishop. He was the Bishop of St Helena from 1999 to 2011. He lived on the island of St Helena, which is situated in the South Atlantic.

== Early life ==
Salt was born in the United Kingdom. Graduating with a Diploma of Theology (London) in 1965. Having previously studied at Kelham (1961), he was ordained deacon in 1966 and priest in 1967 in the Diocese of Carlisle where he served his first curacy.

Salt served as a curate at St Matthew's, Harrogate Street, Barrow. Later, as Bishop of St Helena, he returned to preach in 2007 at a Choral Evensong marking the 40th anniversary of the new church.

== Ministry in Africa ==
In 1970, Salt went to southern Africa to the parish of Mohales Hoek in the Diocese of Lesotho. In 1971 he was appointed assistant chaplain and master at St Agnes' School in Teyateyaneng, thereafter serving at the Cathedral of St Mary and St James in Maseru, the capital of Lesotho.

In 1977, Salt was appointed as precentor at St Cyprian's Cathedral, Kimberley, the mother church of the Diocese of Kimberley and Kuruman, serving under deans Thomas Stanage and Roy Snyman. He subsequently took charge of St Stephen's in Vryburg, in the same diocese.

In 1989, Salt was made the dean of Eshowe and archdeacon of the Cathedral of St Michael and All Angels, Eshowe, in the Diocese of Zululand.

== Bishop of St Helena ==
In 1999, Salt was consecrated as a bishop when he was elected to the Diocese of St Helena, where he was enthroned as the 14th Bishop of St Helena on 26 September 1999. The Bishop of St Helena has jurisdiction over the islands of St Helena and Ascension.

In 2009 the diocese marked its 150th anniversary. On 31 October there was a ceremonial re-enactment of the landing of St Helena's first bishop, Piers Claughton. Salt began the celebration by being rowed ashore, as Bishop Claughton would have been 150 years previously. Locals, some of whom had donned period costume, commented on his courage, given the "undesirable" weather.

As patron of the Citizenship Commission, Salt continued the work of his predecessor, Bishop John Ruston, towards supporting "restoration of full rights of citizenship of those British subjects who are Saint Helenian."

== Private life ==
Salt was an English-constitution Freemason, having been initiated in 1993 in Eshowe Lodge No 2596. On his consecration as Bishop of St Helena he became a member of St Helena Lodge No 488, the only masonic lodge meeting on the island of St Helena.

== Retirement ==
Salt retired as Bishop of St Helena in March 2011, having served for over 11 years. He returned to his native England and lived in Walsingham, Norfolk, where he had an active retirement ministry at the Shrine of Our Lady of Walsingham. He died on 7 February 2017 in Walsingham, Norfolk, at the age of 75.

Anglican Church of Southern Africa titles
Preceded by John Harry Gerald Ruston	Bishop of St Helena; 1999–2011	Succeeded by Richard Fenwick
