= Charlotte Byron Green =

British promoter of women's education (1842–1929)

Charlotte Green
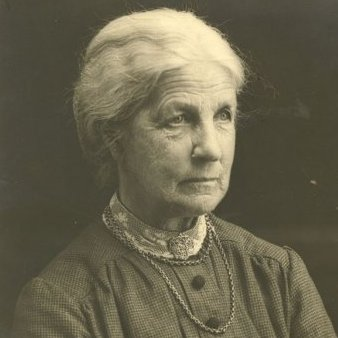
- Born: Charlotte Byron Symonds; 12 August 1842; Bristol, England
- Died: 4 September 1929 (aged 87); Oxford, England
- Known for: Promoting women's education
- Spouse: T. H. Green (m. 1871; died 1882)
- Parents: John Addington Symonds Sr. (father); Harriet Sykes (mother)
- Relatives: John Addington Symonds Jr. (brother)

Charlotte Byron Green (born Charlotte Byron Symonds, 12 August 1842 – 4 September 1929) was a British promoter of women's education. She supported Somerville College from its foundation.

== Life ==
Green was born at Berkeley Square in Bristol in 1842. Her parents were Harriet (born Sykes) and John Addington Symonds, Sr. who was a physician and the author of Criminal Responsibility (1869), The Principles of Beauty (1857) and Sleep and Dreams. She was the last of their four children and her elder brother was the poet and literary critic John Addington Symonds.

In 1871 she married Thomas Hill Green, a friend of her brothers who was known as appearing dull, and Charlotte's father settled £10,000 on the couple as a wedding present. T. H. Green was a fellow of Balliol College and became the White's Professor of Moral Philosophy in 1878. He was a temperance supporter and wanted to see the lower classes admitted to Oxford University.

Green was one of "the don's wives" who organised lectures for women in Oxford which included Lavinia Talbot, Louise Creighton and Mary Augusta Ward. She became secretary of the lectures committee in 1873. Green would go on five years later to join the Association for Promoting the Education of Women in Oxford as a founding member and become the first woman secretary.

She and her husband were active supporters of the creation of Somerville College in 1879. She organised some of the early lectures and she volunteered to knit through many lectures so that the women students could use her as a chaperone when they attended mixed lectures.

Her husband died on 26 March 1882. He was 46 and his death was ascribed to blood poisoning caused by bad milk. Two years later Green was invited to join Somerville College's council and in 1908 she became the council's vice President. She kept this position until 1920 and then remained on the council.

Green died in Oxford in 1929 leaving her husband's papers to Balliol College.

In 2014 her and her husband's grave was renovated.
