= Wilfrid Parker =

The Rt Revd Wilfrid Parker
- Bishop of Pretoria
- Church: Anglican
- Province: Southern Africa
- Diocese: Pretoria
- Installed: 1933
- Term ended: 1950
- Predecessor: Neville Stuart Talbot
- Successor: Robert Selby Taylor

Personal details
- Born: 23 January 1883
- Died: 23 June 1966 (aged 83)

The Rt Rev Wilfrid Parker was a Colonial Anglican bishop in the first half of the 20th century. He was born on 23 January 1883 son of the Hon. Cecil Thomas Parker and Rosamond Esther Harriett Longley. His grandfather on his father's side was Thomas Parker, 6th Earl of Macclesfield and his grandfather on his mother's side was Charles Longley, Archbishop of Canterbury. He was educated at St. Andrew's College, Grahamstown, Radley and Christ Church, Oxford. Ordained in 1907, his first post was as an Assistant Priest at the Christ Church Mission, Poplar. From 1909 to 1913 he was Domestic Chaplain to the Archbishop of York. Cosmo Lang was the Archbishop, and he and Parker developed a close friendship through regular newsy letters until the 1940s when Lang died. Lang's Chaplain in 1933 noted that Parker had a 'halo' as far as Lang, the Archbishop of Canterbury, was concerned. In June, 1916, Parker had been interviewed for a commission as a Temporary Chaplain to the Forces. At 6 feet 7 inches, he was exceptionally tall, he could ride and speak French, and was posted to Flanders where he was immediately involved in the Battle of the Somme. He was ill with trench fever from September, was hospitalised in England and was only fit to return to his duties in France early in 1917. He was then posted to Italy where he earned the Croce di Guerra, a bravery award. A report of December, 1918, referred to 'Very exceptional gifts as an Army Chaplain - good report When peace returned he became Vicar of St George's Johannesburg. From 1923 to 1931 he was Priest in Charge of the St Cyprian's Native Mission in the same city then Archdeacon and Director of Native Missions in the Diocese of Pretoria. He became Bishop of Pretoria in 1933 holding the post until his retirement in 1950. A Sub Prelate of the Order of Saint John of Jerusalem, he died on 23 June 1966.

== Notes ==
- Poland, Marguerite (2008). The Boy in You: A Biography of St. Andrew's College, 1855-2005. Fernwood Press. ISBN 978-1-874950-86-8.

Anglican Church of Southern Africa titles
Preceded by Neville Stuart Talbot	Bishop of Pretoria; 1933 – 1950	Succeeded by Robert Selby Taylor
