= Richard Kraft =

American-born South African Anglican Bishop

The Right Reverend Richard Austin Kraft
- Bishop of Pretoria
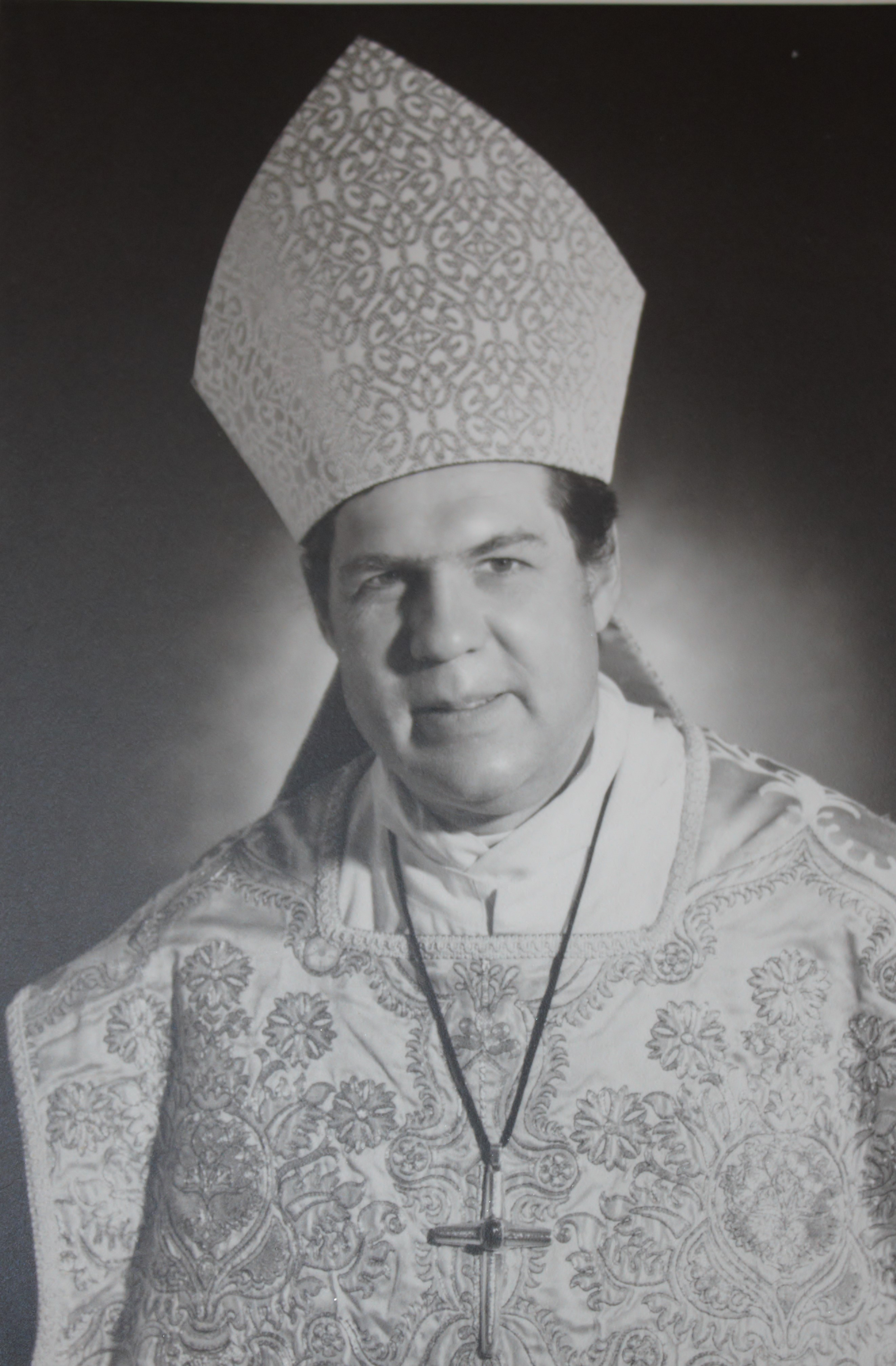

Personal details
- Born: June 3, 1936
- Died: January 17, 2001 (aged 64)

Richard Austin Kraft (3 June 1936 - 17 January 2001) was an American-born South African Anglican Bishop.

Born in the United States, he was educated at Ripon College, Wisconsin and the General Theological Seminary, NY, NY and ordained in 1961. He moved to South Africa, where his first post was as an Assistant Priest at St Alphege Church, in Pietermaritzburg. From 1963 to 1967 he was Rector of St Chad's Mission, Klip River.

In 1968 he was asked by Bishop Alpheus Zulu to be Director of Christian Education in the Diocese of Zululand. He was also rector of All Saints Parish, Melmoth, KwaZulu-Natal from 1974 to 1976. As Director of Christian Education he was responsible for continuing the programme of experienced-based education (also known as group dynamics, sensitivity training or T-groups) pioneered by another American priest, Don Griswold. He also pioneered the training of self-supporting clergy at the diocesan conference centre KwaNzimela, near Melmoth, inspired by the principles enunciated by Roland Allen.

In 1976 he was appointed Director of the Education Department of the Church of the Province of South Africa and then Dean of Pretoria. In 1982 he became Bishop of Pretoria, a post he held until 1998. He was a strong opponent of the apartheid regime. He died on 17 January 2001 in Pretoria.
