= Toc H =

International Christian movement

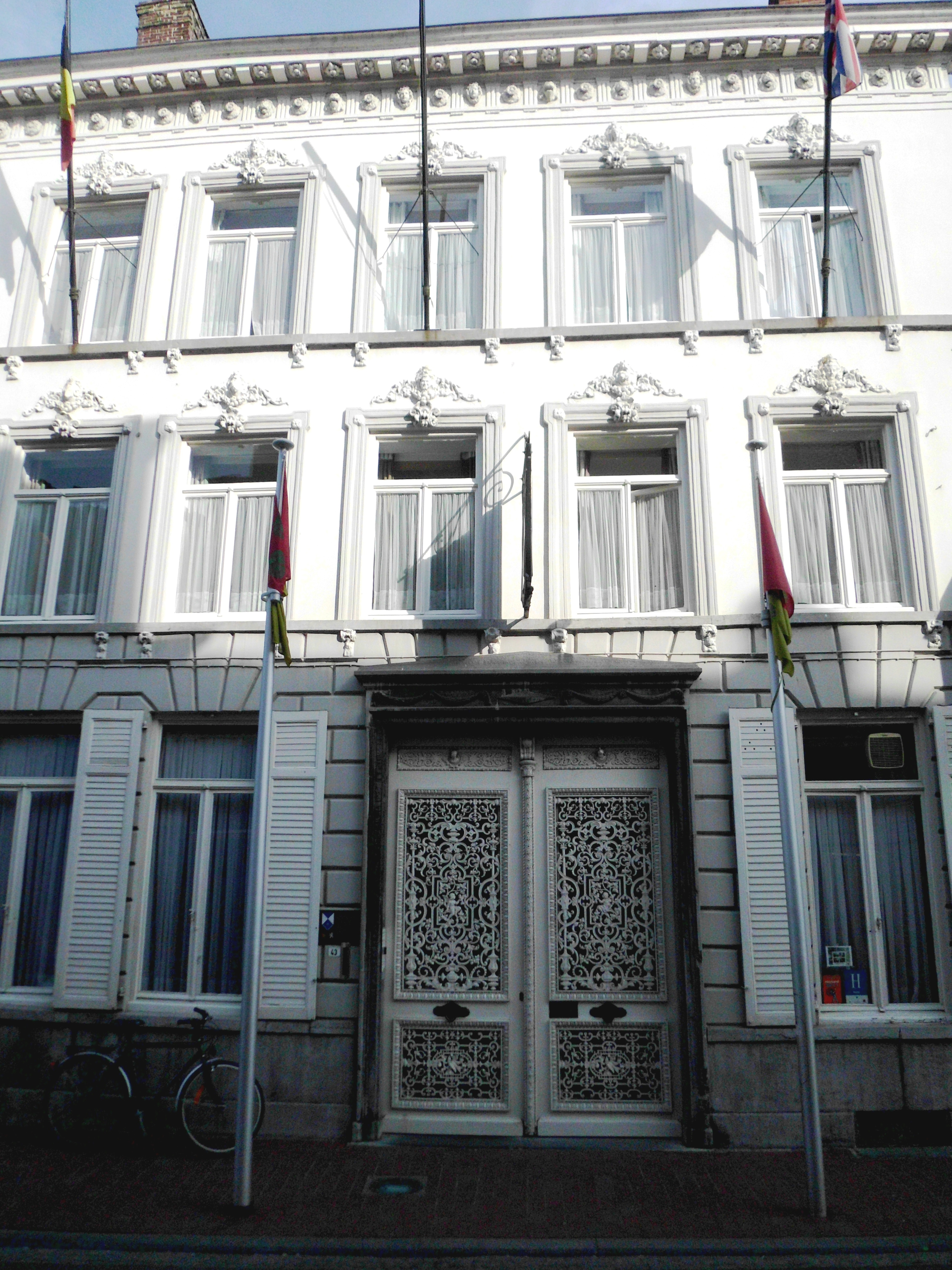
Talbot House in Poperinge, Belgium

Toc H (/ˈtɒk eɪtʃ/; also TH) is a registered charity and an international Christian movement. The name is an abbreviation for Talbot House, "Toc" signifying the letter T in the signals spelling alphabet used by the British Army in World War I. A soldiers' rest and recreation centre named Talbot House was founded in December 1915 at Poperinghe, Belgium. It aimed to promote Christianity and was named in memory of Gilbert Talbot, son of Lavinia Talbot and Edward Talbot, then Bishop of Winchester, who had been killed at Hooge in July 1915.

== Today ==
Today Toc H works across the UK in partnership with local charities and resident organisations to deliver services to alleviate socioeconomic disadvantage and foster community participation. Priority areas include the small communities Eveswell and Pillgwennlly in South Wales, Blackpool South Shore and Thornbury, Bradford. Toc H continues to support various traditional membership-based branches, including Denny, Saltburn-by-the-Sea and Looe. In December 2024 Toc H secured £300,000 from the Department for Levelling Up, Housing and Communities Community Ownership Fund to renovate Eveswell Community Centre in Newport, Wales.

== History ==
The founders were Gilbert's elder brother Neville Talbot, then a senior army chaplain, and the Reverend Philip Thomas Byard (Tubby) Clayton. Talbot House was styled as an "Every Man's Club", where all soldiers were welcome, regardless of rank. It was "an alternative for the 'debauched' recreational life of the town". In 1920, Clayton founded a Christian youth centre in London, also called Toc H, which developed into an interdenominational association for Christian social service. The original building at Poperinghe has been maintained and redeveloped as a museum and tourist venue. Branches of Toc H were established in many countries around the world. An Australian branch was formed in Victoria in 1925 by Rev. Herbert Hayes. Another was formed in Adelaide the same year.

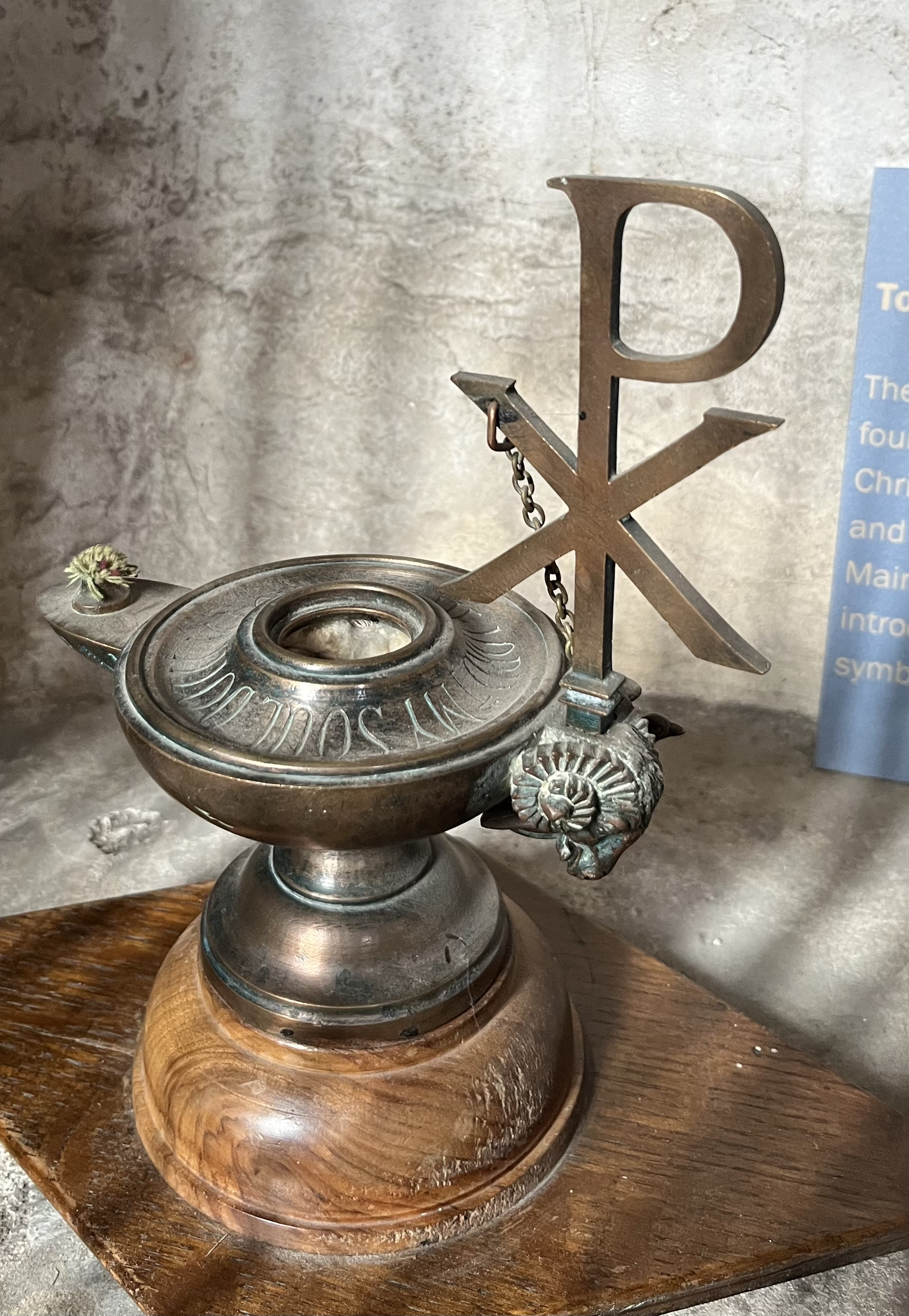
Toc H lamp in St Albans Cathedral

In 1922, the organization introduced the Lamp of Maintenance, or Toc H lamp, to remember those who died in World War I.

Toc H members seek to ease the burdens of others through acts of service. They also promote reconciliation and work to bring disparate sections of society together. Branches may organise localised activities such as hospital visits, entertainment for the residents of care homes and organising residential holidays for special groups.

The organisation suffered a progressive decline in membership and closure of branches during the later 20th century. However, in the 21st century, Toc H trustees and staff have been working together for it to become a stronger movement still guided by the ethos of the original Talbot House.

=== Foundation in World War I ===
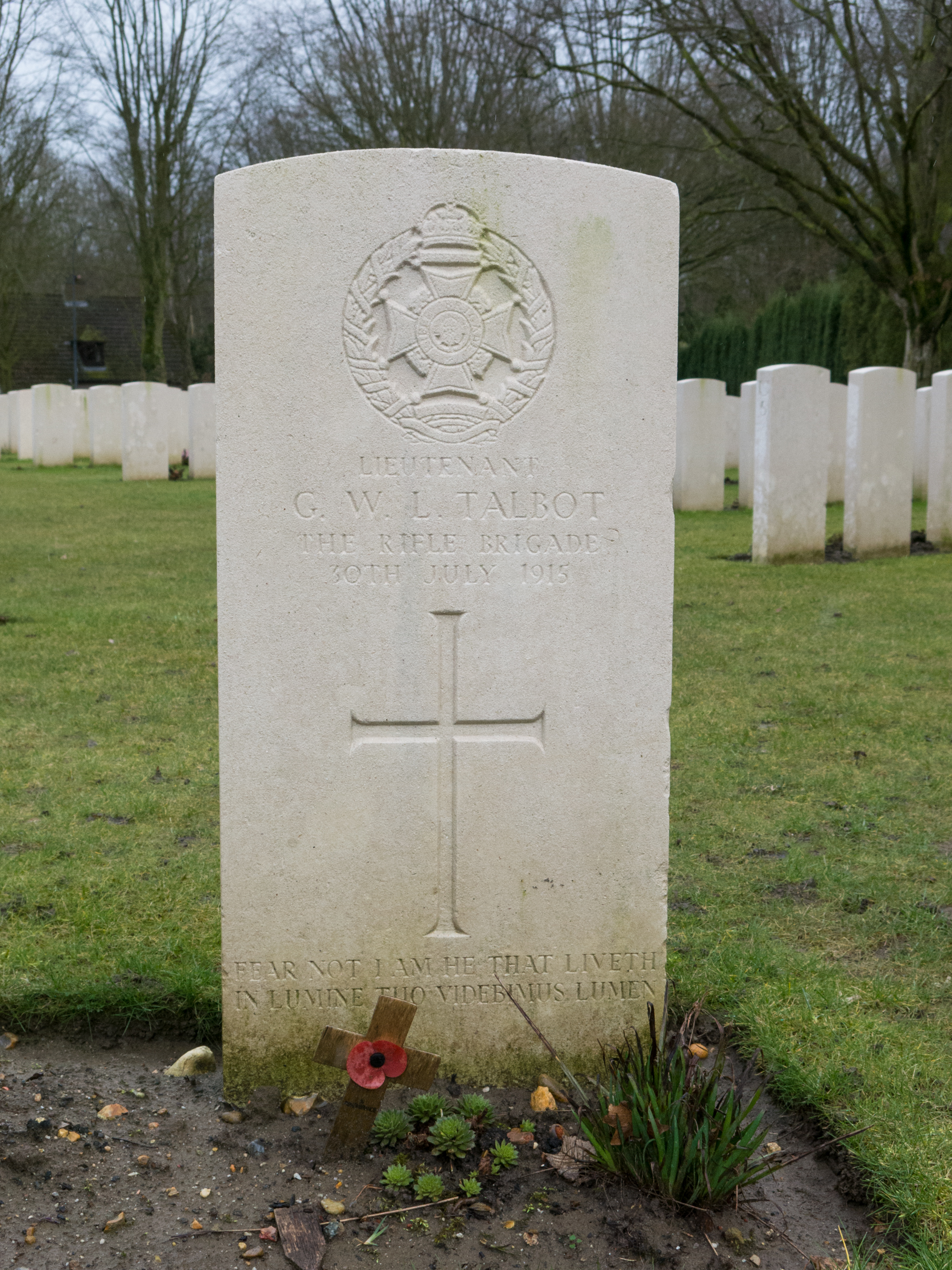
Headstone of Gilbert Talbot at Sanctuary Wood Cemetery near Ypres, Belgium

At the outbreak of World War I Neville Talbot, a senior Church of England chaplain in the British Army, sought to recruit chaplains who would minister to the battalions on the front lines. One of his recruits was the Reverend Phillip Byard Clayton, who was assigned to the East Kent and Bedfordshire regiments. In 1915 Clayton was sent to France and then on to the town of Poperinge in Belgium.

Sitting a few miles back from the trenches around Ypres (nowadays known by its Flemish name Ieper), Poperinge (or "Pops", as the soldiers called it) was a busy transfer station where troops on their way to and from the battlefields of Flanders were billeted. Clayton, universally known as "Tubby", was instructed by Neville Talbot to set up some sort of rest house for the troops.

Clayton chose the Coevoet house – temporarily vacated by its owner, a wealthy local hop merchant – to use as his base, paying rent of 150 francs a month. The house had received significant damage from shellfire, especially the hop loft and the garden. Repairs were begun in September by the Royal Engineers. It opened on 11 December 1915.

Clayton decided to steer away from the traditional church club and set up an Everyman’s House. It was named Talbot House in honour of Lieutenant Gilbert Talbot (Neville’s brother) who had been killed earlier in the year. Talbot House soon became known by its initials TH, and then, in the radio signallers’ phonetic alphabet of the day as Toc Aitch.

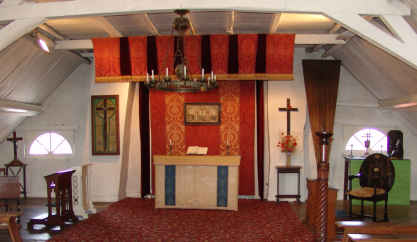
The Upper Room at Talbot House in Poperinge, Belgium

The focus of religious services and devotions was a chapel created in the attic, known as the "Upper Room". After the war's end, in 1918,

the interior of the Chapel was sent to London, and temporarily displayed in the crypt of All Hallows-by-the-Tower. From the concise guidebook Clayton compiled for its visitors, we learn why precisely these objects had to be taken home, and why they would return to Poperinge in 1929.

== Schools ==
Toc H runs schools in India such as Toc-H Public School.

In 2004 it was reported that Toc H had decided to invest in an academy school in Bradford, England. The then chief executive, Geoff Smith, said that the academy would reflect the charity's commitment to community building. It was opened in 2008 by John Sentamu, the Archbishop of York.

== Spirit ==
The spirit of friendship fostered at Toc H across social and denominational boundaries inspired Clayton, the Rev. Dick Sheppard and Alexander Paterson to set out in 1920 what became known as the Four points of the Toc H compass:

1. Friendship ("To love widely")
2. Service ("To build bravely")
3. Fairmindedness ("To think fairly")
4. The Kingdom of God ("To witness humbly")

This followed the foundation of a new Toc H House in Kensington in 1919, followed by others in London, Manchester, and Southampton. The Toc H movement continued to grow in numbers and established, also, a women's league. In 1930, Clayton led Toc H into creative support of the British Empire Leprosy Relief Association.

== See also ==
- "Pow R. Toc H." (Pink Floyd song)
