= Talbot House, Manchester =

Charity in Manchester, England

Talbot House
- Founded: 1976; 50 years ago
- Type: Not-for-profit organisation
- Purpose: Unpaid carers
- Location: Manchester, United Kingdom
- Region served: Manchester
- Services: Advice and support
- Website: www.talbot-house.org.uk

Talbot House, Manchester is a charity based in Newton Heath which supports families of children with learning difficulties. It is run by people who are parents of disabled children. It was started in 1976 by 4 mothers with disabled children. It was then known as the Peter Pan Centre. Bernie Wood joined them shortly after that and is still the manager. Her son was born in 1978 with Down Syndrome.

In 2010 it was given £50,000 by Chris Brown, a secret millionaire. Manchester Masons gave them £15,000 in 2022.

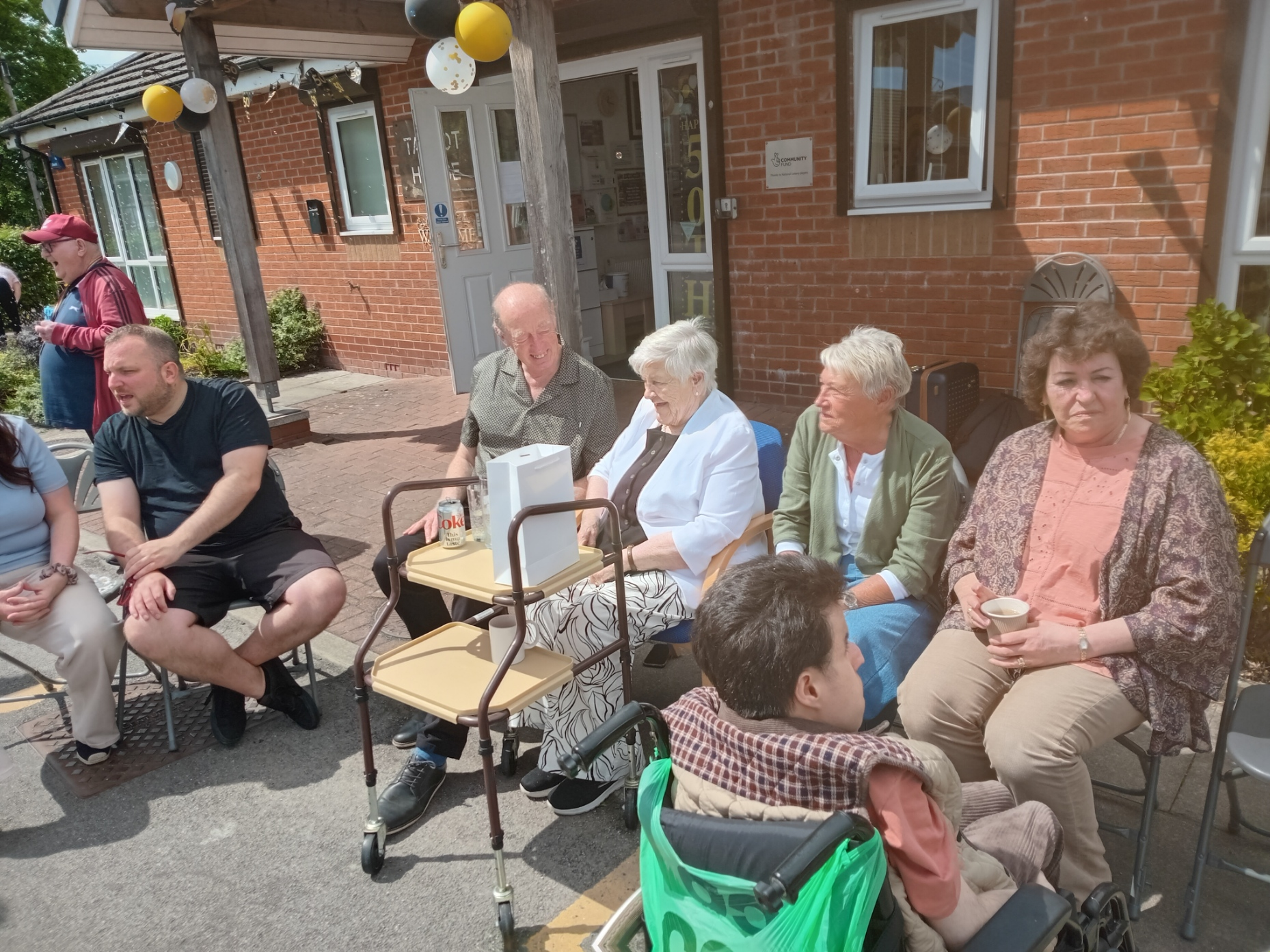

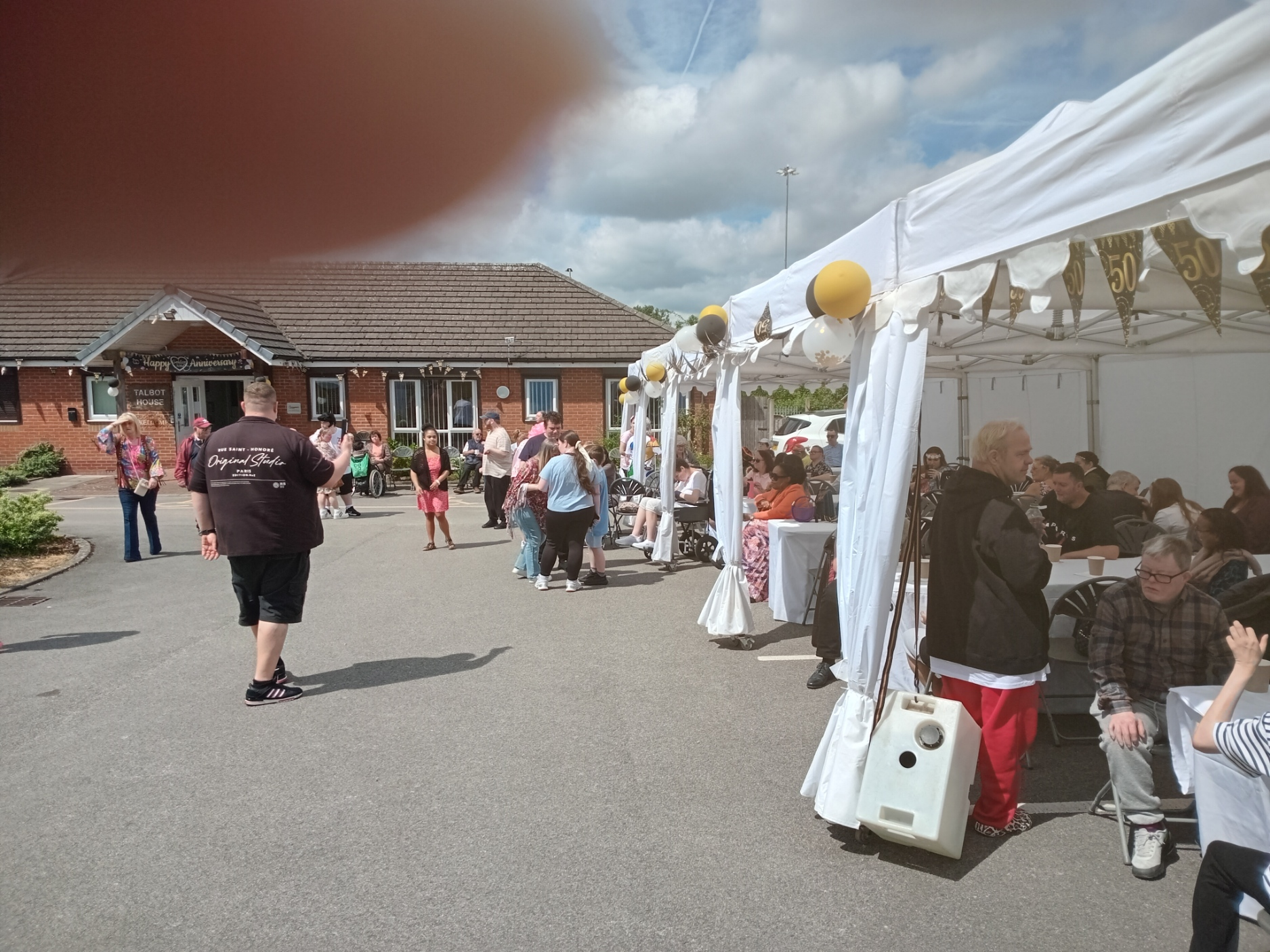

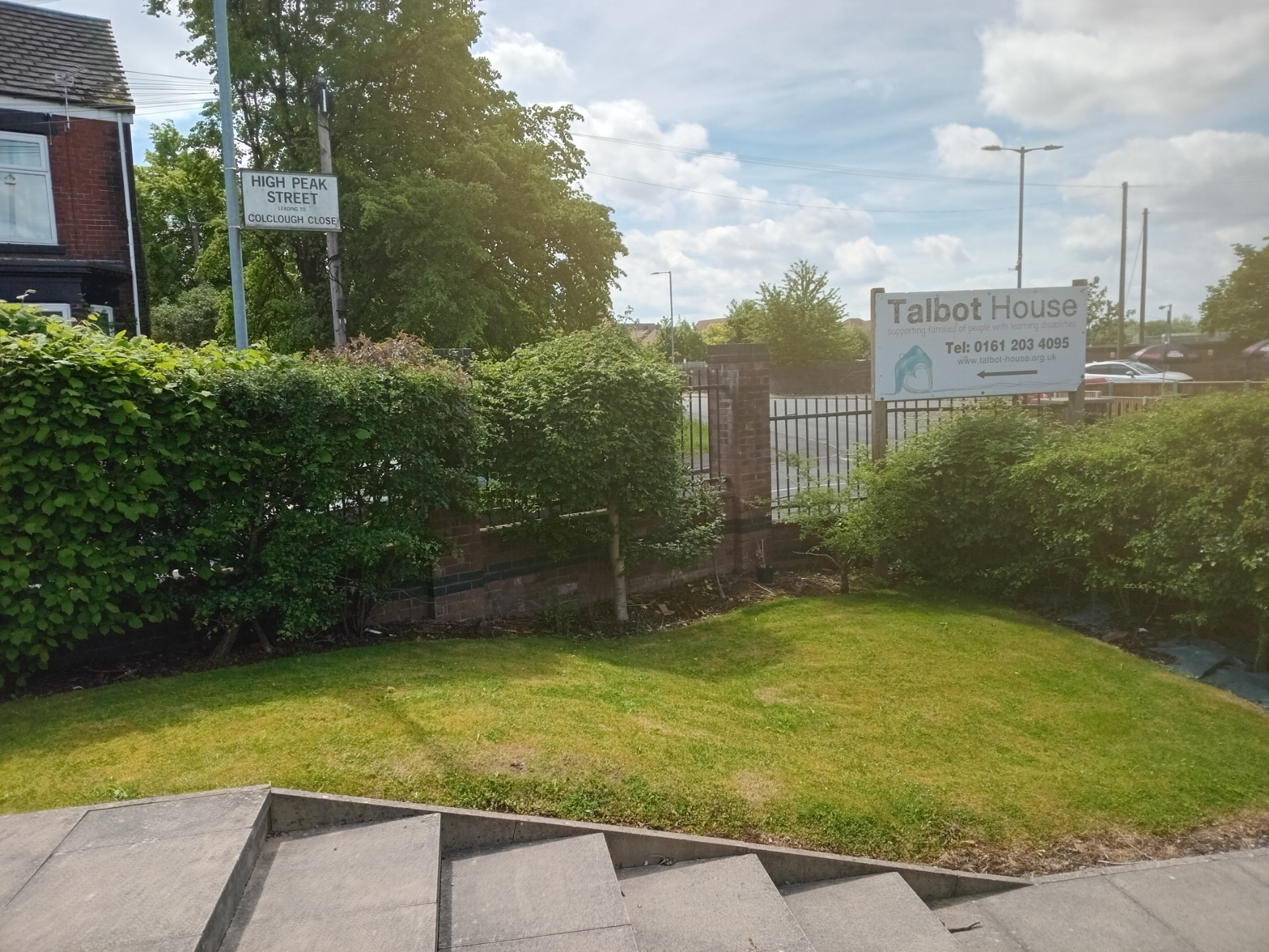
