= Henry Bousfield =

British Anglican colonial bishop (1832–1902)

The Right Reverend Henry Bousfield
- Bishop of Pretoria
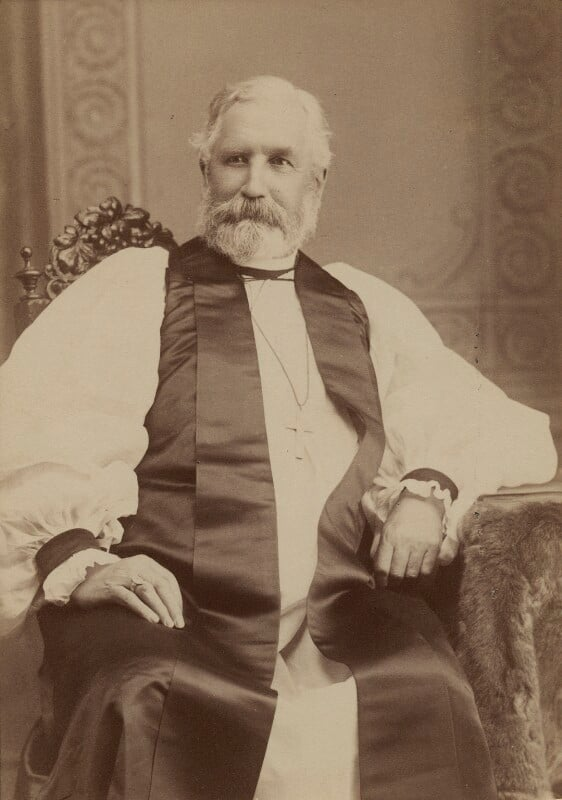
- Bousfield, 1880s–1890s
- Diocese: Diocese of Pretoria
- In office: 1878–1902
- Successor: William Carter

Orders
- Ordination: 1856 by Charles Sumner, Bishop of Winchester
- Consecration: 1878

Personal details
- Born: 27 March 1832
- Died: 10 February 1902 (aged 69)
- Denomination: Anglican
- Education: Gonville and Caius College, Cambridge

Henry Brougham Bousfield (27 March 1832 – 10 February 1902) was a colonial Anglican priest and the inaugural Bishop of Pretoria 1878-1902.

== Life ==
Bousfield was born on 27 March 1832, the son of William Cheek Bousfield, a barrister. He was educated at Merchant Taylors' School, Northwood and Gonville and Caius College, Cambridge (whence he gained his Cambridge Master of Arts). Ordained in 1856, his first post was as a curate at All Saints, Braishfield. From 1861 to 1870 he was vicar of St Maurice Winchester, then rural dean of Andover from 1870 to 1878.

He became the inaugural Bishop of Pretoria in 1878 holding the post until his death on 10 February 1902. He was instrumental in promoting the Anglican church in what is today the Limpopo Province and the Diocese of St Mark the Evangelist. At the urging of local congregants in Pietersburg (now renamed Polokwane) he sent Christ Church their first rector, A. Weinstein, in 1895. Christ Church became a centre of mission work into the northern region of the Anglican Diocese of Pretoria. At some point he had become a Doctor of Divinity (DD).

== Works ==
- Six Years in the Transvaal: Notes of the Founding of the Church There. Soc. for Promoting Christian Knowledge, Young. 1886.
- Notes for Catechising

== Family ==
Bousfield married, in 1861, Charlotte Elizabeth Higginson, daughter of Jonathan Higginson, of Rock Ferry, Liverpool. She died in 1886, and he remarried, in 1888, Ellen Lamb, daughter of Thomas Lamb, of Andover.

== Notes ==
Anglican Church of Southern Africa titles
New title	Bishop of Pretoria; 1878–1902	Succeeded by William Carter
