= Ludwig Meidner =

German expressionist artist (1884-1966)

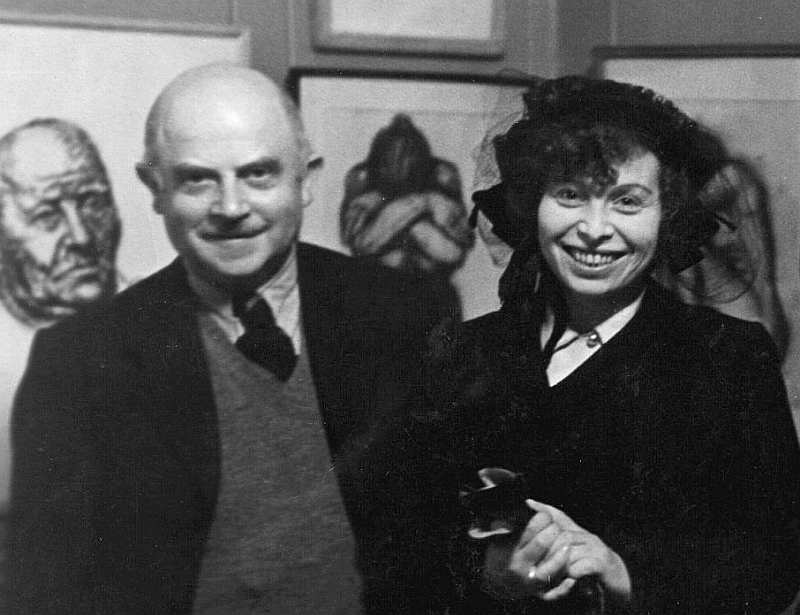
- Ludwig Meidner, with his wife, Else Meidner (1949)
- Born: 18 April 1884; Bernstadt, Silesia, German Empire (modern Poland)
- Died: 16 May 1966 (aged 82); Darmstadt, West Germany
- Known for: Painting
- Movement: Expressionism

Signature
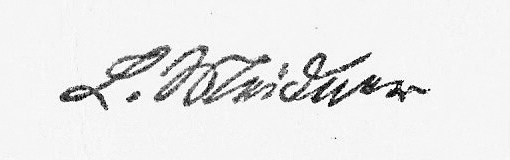

Untitled lithograph by Ludwig Meidner from the book Septemberschrei, 1918, Fine Arts Museums of San Francisco

Ludwig Meidner (18 April 1884 – 14 May 1966) was a German expressionist painter and printmaker born in Bernstadt, Silesia. Meidner is best known for his painted, drawn, and printed portraits and landscapes, but is especially noted for his "apocalyptic" series of work featuring his stylized visions of a pending transformation of Germany before World War I.

== Overview ==
Ludwig Meidner was apprenticed to a stonemason, but his apprenticeship was not completed. He studied at the Royal School of Art in Breslau and, from 1906 to 1907 he studied painting at the Académie Julian and Cormon Academies in Paris where he met and became friends with Amedeo Modigliani. He returned to Berlin to work as a fashion illustrator and produced views of Berlin.

In 1912 he began a series of paintings that marked a radical departure in style and would make his reputation."Apocalyptic Landscapes," such as the 1914 graphite drawing at the Art Institute of Chicago, are interesting because Meidner executed them before any of the devastation of the First World War. During the same time, Ludwig co-founded the German expressionist group, "Die Pathetiker" with Jacob Steirnhardt and Richard Janthur. Their focus is on the use of pathos in art to get an emotional response, which can be seen in the apocalyptic landscapes. However his art group disbanded after their first art show in 1912.

During WWI Ludwig served in the German military as a French interpreter and an infantry soldier.

After the First World War Meidner turned to Orthodox Judaism and began producing more baroque-like religious paintings including a long and repetitive series of portraits of "prophets." He was an habitual self portraitist producing a series of Rembrandt-inspired self-portraits. His portraits from 1915 to the end of the 1920s are a gallery of the leading expressionist and Dada writers and poets. Meidner himself increasingly turned to writing—he produced several books of dense expressionist prose and contributed to many newspaper articles.

In order to escape antisemitic repressions he moved to Cologne where he became an art teacher at Yawneh Jewish School in 1935. In 1939 he fled with his family to England (his wife Else Meidner was also an artist) where he was interned as an enemy alien on the Isle of Man. He stayed in England, unrecognised, hovering on the brink of poverty until 1953 when he returned to Germany. Although the years in exile were a period of hardship and disappointment, he created an extensive oeuvre of very original works during this time. Among those are drawings and watercolors on religious subjects, humoristic scenes and a cycle on the holocaust.

In 1963 he had his first major exhibition since 1918 in Recklinghausen and Berlin. He died on 14 May 1966 in Darmstadt, aged 82.

Meidner's artistic bequest is now part of the collections of the Jewish Museum Frankfurt.

== Painting ==
Ludwig Meidner created numerous portraits throughout his life as a painter. His portraits are known to be distorted with flowing movements that create unusual perspectives in the paintings. This form of distortion and his unrefined brushstrokes is credited as helping to create an emotional sense of depression and anxiety in his portraits, which in turn detoured many from getting portraits done by Ludwig. Multiple expressionist writers such as Johannes R. Becher and Max Herrmann-Neisse got painted portraits done by Meidner. Other than portraits Ludwig also created multiple landscapes of Berlin, which are frequently known as apocalyptic from the style of the pieces. However, only a single painting is directly connected the idea of apocalypse through the title. While some people believe they predict the oncoming of WWI, others see it as presenting the movement and chaos of the urban world. The series, produced rapidly in a hectic heatwave, are sometimes considered some of the purest "expressionist" works; in them, comets cross the sky like cannon shells, fires rage, men scream and flee for their lives, buildings totter on the edge of collapse. Meidner would, however, never repeat the intensity and creativity of the apocalyptic landscapes.

== Printmaking ==
Ludwig's prints are made mostly through the processes of hard ground etchings, lithographs, and dry point. He continued making portraits in printmaking, such as a lithograph Theodor Dauber and an etching of Johannes Becher, that are reminiscent of his painted portrait style. He also created an eight piece collection of lithographs known as "Krieg" ("War"-German). The different prints show scenes of battle, death, bombs, guns, and overall destruction. They are made near the start of WWI to protest the war and show the horrific outcomes of war. These prints show Ludwig's far left political views on War and his connection to the Social Democratic Party of Germany.

== Writing ==
Along with being a visual artist. Meidner is also an author of poetry and stories. While he mostly wrote poems, he also wrote a short story and three books: "Gang in die Stile" 1929," Septemberschei" 1920, and "Im Nacken das Sternemeer" 1918; none of which became popular. Meidner created a large majority of his poetry during his time at war in WWI, since he did not have much time or supplies needed to paint, draw, or make prints. A large majority of his writing has a darker tone and eerie stories, which are told from his point of view on the world. However, Meidner's writing never grew in popularity as much as his art did with the expressionist.

== Bibliography ==
- Eliel, Carol S., "The Apocalyptic Landscapes of Ludwig Meidner", Los Angeles, California, Los Angeles County Museum of Art, 1989.
- Meidner, Ludwig, "Ludwig Meidner, An Expressionist Master", Ann Arbor, Michigan, The Museum, 1978.
- "Ludwig und Else Meidner" (exhibition catalogue in German and English) Frankfurt a. M. Jüdisches Museum Frankfurt, Ben Uri Gallery, 2002
- "Eavesdropper on an age : Ludwig Meidner in exile" (exhibition catalogue Museum Giersch der Goethe-Universität, Frankfurt am Main). Munich, Hirmer, 2016, ISBN 978-3-7774-2586-3 (Englisch); ISBN 978-3-7774-2554-2 (German)
- Erik Riedel, Mirjam Wenzel (Ed.): Ludwig Meidner. Expressionismus, Ekstase, Exil / Expressionism, Ecstasy, Exile. Berlin 2018, ISBN 978-3-7861-2784-0. (German and English)
