= Else Meidner =

German painter (1901–1987)

- Else Meidner in her studio
- Born: Else Meyer; September 2, 1901; Berlin, Germany
- Died: May 7, 1987 (aged 85); London, United Kingdom
- Known for: Painting
- Spouse: Ludwig Meidner (m. 1927)

Else Meidner (born Else Meyer; 2 September 1901 – 7 May 1987) was a German-Jewish painter.

== Biography ==
Meidner was born in Berlin and studied there between 1918 and 1925 before spending two years in Cologne. In 1927 she married the painter Ludwig Meidner and they emigrated to England in August 1939. There Else Meidner worked as a domestic.

After World War II the couple drifted apart, both emotionally and artistically and Ludwig returned to Germany in 1953 while Else stayed in London. In 1951 the Meidner's son, David (born 1929), emigrated to Israel. Else returned to Germany in 1963 to take care of the ailing Ludwig, but eventually returned to London. She died in London.

== Career ==
Else Meidner exhibited in Berlin before fleeing to London, and after the war she exhibited at the Ben Uri Gallery, London; the Galerie Hanna Bekker vom Rath, Frankfurt; the Matthiesen Gallery, London; the Beaux Arts Gallery, London; and the Leicester Gallery, London.

== See also ==
- List of German women artists
