= Martin Breytenbach =

South African Anglican bishop

The Rt Revd Martin Breytenbach
- Bishop of St Mark the Evangelist
- Church: Anglican
- Province: Southern Africa
- Diocese: St Mark the Evangelist
- Installed: 12 February 2000

Martin Andre Breytenbach was a South African Anglican bishop. He was the bishop of the Diocese of St Mark the Evangelist, a diocese of the Anglican Church of Southern Africa (ACSA) from 2000 to 2019.

== Education ==
He trained and worked as a civil engineer before entering the priesthood. He was consecrated bishop of the Diocese of St Mark the Evangelist in a service held on 5 February 2000, at St. Mary's Cathedral, in Johannesburg, by the Archbishop of Canterbury, George Carey. Since becoming bishop, Breytenbach has been Liaison Bishop for the Anglican Students’ Federation, as well as for Anglican Renewal Ministries (now Anglicans Ablaze) and SOMA (Sharing of Ministries Abroad).

He is a member of the ACSA Liturgical Committee. He serves as chairman of ACSA's new initiative, Growing the Church.

He retired after 19 years in the Diocese of St Mark the Evangelist in February 2019.

== Sources ==
- Alison Morgan (2011). The Word on the Wind: Renewing Confidence in the Gospel. Monarch Books. p. 187. ISBN 978-0-85721-015-9.
- Africa Today. Afro Media. 2004. p. 292.
- Clarke, Bob (2008). Anglicans against apartheid, 1936-1996. Cluster Publications. p. 390. ISBN 978-1-875053-73-5.
- Ledwaba, Moroamaraba Shashi Johannes (2005), The development of indigenous leadership in the Church of the Province of Southern Africa, with special reference to the Diocese of St. Mark the Evangelist., University of Pretoria, hdl:2263/26903
- Useh, Rosa Isegbuyota (2006), The role of the Anglican Church in the prevention of the spread of HIV and Aids in the Limpopo province, UNISA, hdl:10500/1992

Anglican Church of Southern Africa titles
Preceded by Philip Le Feuvre	Diocese of St Mark the Evangelist; 2011-	Incumbent
