= Hans Meidner =

South African botanist (1914–2001)

Prof Hans Anton Meidner FRSE (January 14, 1914 – September 11, 2001) was a South African botanist and expert in stomata. He was affectionately known as Big H. Meidner also served as leader of the Liberal Party of South Africa for several years.

== Life ==
He was born on 14 January 1914 in Berlin and raised in Breslau (now Wroclaw in Poland). He fled Germany in the 1930s due to increasing difficulties and went first to Ireland then to South Africa.

In the Second World War he fought for the Allies with the South African forces serving in North Africa, Italy and Greece. In Greece he was taken prisoner of war by the communist partisans.

After the war he studied Botany at the University of Natal graduating BSc then MSc then gaining a doctorate (PhD). He became a lecturer in 1951. In 1960, in the aftermath of the Sharpeville massacre he was imprisoned as a communist sympathiser. He was detained for three months without charge.

He moved to England to lecture at Reading in 1964 before settling in Stirling in Scotland as Professor of Botany at Stirling University. A keen amateur artist he was actively involved with the Stirling Smith Art Gallery and Museum.

In 1978 he was elected a Fellow of the Royal Society of Edinburgh. His proposers were Sir William D. P. Stewart, William Whigham Fletcher, James A. MacDonald, Robert M. M. Crawford, and Malcolm Wilkins.

He retired in 1982 and moved to Northampton and died there on 11 September 2001.

== Publications ==
- Physiology of Stomata
- Class Experiments in Plant Physiology
- Methods in Stomatal Research
- Plants and Water

== Family ==
He was married to Olga and had two children, Hans and Hilary.
