= Diocese of St Mark the Evangelist =

Location
- Ecclesiastical province: Anglican Church of Southern Africa

Statistics
- Parishes: 24

Information
- Rite: Anglican
- Cathedral: Christ Church Cathedral, Polokwane

Current leadership
- Bishop: Vacant

Website
- stmark.org.za

The Anglican Diocese of St Mark the Evangelist covers the Limpopo Province

The Diocese of St Mark the Evangelist is a diocese in the Anglican Church of Southern Africa, in the geographical area of the Limpopo province in the north of South Africa.

== History ==
The area now known as the Diocese of St Mark the Evangelist used to be part of the Anglican Diocese of Pretoria. The Anglican church in the North was administered by the Diocesan Administrator and Bishops in Pretoria. The ordination of deacons and priests was done at St Albans Cathedral in Pretoria. The Bishop and Suffragan Bishop of the Diocese of Pretoria would visit the area to take confirmation services and to preside at other special occasions. Suffragan Bishop John Ruston was sent to Polokwane (then, Pietersburg) to oversee the northern region of the Diocese of Pretoria. Under his leadership a new diocese was established in the North by the name of St Mark the Evangelist. The Diocese of St Mark the Evangelist was inaugurated on 16 May 1987.

Philip Le Feuvre was elected a bishop in August 1987 and consecrated as the first bishop of the new diocese on 30 January 1988. Archbishop Desmond Tutu, Metropolitan and Bishop of Anglican Diocese of Cape Town, conducted the service held at Christ Church, Polokwane. Bishop Philip's vision was for a diocese that would be involved in evangelism and church planting across the Limpopo Province, the least evangelised area of South Africa. His forthright devotion to mission fundamentals typified the work of St Mark the Evangelist's first bishop.

Martin Breytenbach was installed as the second bishop of the diocese on 12 February 2000. The service was conducted by the recently retired Bishop Duncan Buchanan, from the Anglican Diocese of Johannesburg on behalf of the Metropolitan. The service was held at the Mokopane College of Education in the Parish of Mahwelereng.

== Administration ==
The diocese shadows the geographical area of the Limpopo Province. Given the size, the diocese has been divided into sub-regions, known as Archdeaconries, to facilitate better administrative and leadership processes. The diocese initially had only four Archdeaconries, which corresponded with the six main roads in the Limpopo Province. They were the Archdeaconries of the Vhembe, Kopanong, West, South West, Waterberg and Mopani. Due to the multiplication of parishes in 2008, another Archdeaconry was added in 2009 and some of the parishes re-allocated. The archdeaconries and parishes that fall under them are as follows:

Vhembe Archdeaconry

- Zoutpansberg parish
- Musina mission
- Dzindi parish
- Matthew Nemakhavhani parish
- Malamulele parish

Kopanong Archdeaconry

- Christ Church Cathedral Polokwane parish
- Good Shephered parish : Extension 44 and 78
- Seshego parish
- Moletsi parish
- MoSamaria mission

Lepelle Archdeaconry

- Sekhukhuneland parish
- St Mark's College
- Lebowakgomo parish
- Moganyaka mission parish

South-West Archdeaconry

- Mokopane Parish
- Lephalale Parish
- Mapela Parish

Western Archdeaconry

- Mashashane parish
- Baken-Matji parish
- Matlala Parish

Mopani Archdeaconry

- Letaba parish
- St Luke's parish: Phalaborwa
- St Paul's United: Haenertsburg
- Baobab mission parish
- Tlhatlaganya Parish
- Hoedspruit Community Church

Waterberg Archdeaconry

- Modimolle parish
- St Michael's United
- St John's 24 Rivers
- GaSeabe parish

== Synods ==
A Synod is the highest decision-making body of the diocese. A Bishop may assemble a Synod as often as he thinks fit and shall not do so less than once every three years. Clergy and lay people are summoned to the Synod at least four months before the appointed sitting of Synod. The summons is by citation under the Bishop's hand and seal. Diocesan organisations such as the Anglican Women's Fellowship, Bernard Mizeki Men's Guild, Mothers' Union, Guild of St Mary Magdalene, Green Anglicans, Iviyo Lofakazi baka Kristu (evangelism movement), Anglican Men's Fellowship and Anglican Students' Federation elect a person to represent them on Synod.

A session of Synod is convened and run with very formal procedures. Motions, proposals and reports must be submitted to a duly constituted Synod Committee before Synod commences. Synod business is arranged and compiled into an Agenda book, which is circulated several weeks before the start of Synod. Synod is opened with a celebration of the Holy Communion. After the Nicene Creed the Registrar, confirms that a quorum is present and informs the Bishop. The Bishop then declares the Synod open.

Synod business typically deals with a report from the Finance Board, reports from Diocesan Boards and Institutions, actions from resolutions passed at previous Synods, motions and proposals, and elections to Diocesan and Provincial offices/boards. One of the most important aspects of a Synod is the Bishop's Charge to Synod, which outlines his vision, priorities and challenges to the diocese.

- 2003 – Bishop's Charge:
- 2006 – Bishop's Charge: "Make Disciples – Transform the World"
- 2009 – Bishop's Charge: "God's Covenant People"

== List of bishops ==
- Philip Le Feuvre 1987–2000
  - John Ruston, Suffragan Bishop of Pretoria (formerly for the area which became St Mark's diocese) was initially vicar-general of the new diocese
- Martin Breytenbach 2000 – 28 February 2019
- Luke Pretorius 2019-2026

== Coat of arms ==
Arms of the Diocese of St Mark the Evangelist

The diocese registered a coat of arms at the Bureau of Heraldry in 1998 : Argent, in chief a Lion of St. Mark with a scroll issuant from the mouth and flexed between the legs, and in base a baobab tree, sans leaves, Purpure; the shield ensigned of an Episcopal mitre proper.

== Jane Furse Memorial Hospital ==
Michael Bolton Furse and American wife, Frances, moved to South Africa from England in 1903. Their only child, a daughter, Jane was born on 19 August 1904. In 1909 Michael Furse was consecrated the Bishop of Pretoria . When Bishop Michael trekked around the vast Anglican Diocese of Pretoria, Jane would sometimes accompany him. She became sorrowfully aware of the poverty and disease rife among the African people. She made up her mind to be a doctor in order to serve them. But Jane contracted scarlet fever and died on 3 August 1918. She was buried at a cemetery in Irene in Pretoria.

In 1921 work began on a hospital to be built in her memory in a part of the diocese known as Sekhukhuneland. The hospital was named the Jane Furse Memorial Hospital. It grew in reputation in South Africa and internationally as a centre of excellence. The greater part of the medical staff came from the United Kingdom, supplemented by doctors from Canada, New Zealand, Zimbabwe, Germany and South Africa. Medical students came from the USA, Germany and Israel to gain valuable experience. As the mission hospital grew, so did the town, businesses and services around Jane Furse, which eventually become known by the name of the hospital.

On 1 May 1976 the hospital was taken over by the Lebowa Government at the insistence of the South African government. As part of the process of land restitution in the Limpopo Province, the extensive hospital complex and agricultural grounds were returned to the Anglican Diocese of St Mark the Evangelist in 2004. The government remained in control of the hospital while a new complex was being built on the outskirts of the town of Jane Furse.

When the hospital was decommissioned in 2008 and moved into the new Jane Furse Hospital, everything of value, including items of historical interest, were stripped and sold off, leaving the buildings derelict. The Anglican Diocese of St Mark the Evangelist is seeking compensation from the relevant government departments for the damage to the property.

A slow process of rehabilitating the Jane Furse Memorial Hospital and grounds for use of a range of non-medical activities is being undertaken, in the hope that it can once again be a place of service to the surrounding community. It currently houses the Jane Furse fire brigade, a post-natal clinic, a crèche and a centre for disabled children. An NGO is using part of the agricultural land to train people in appropriate small-scale farming techniques. A drop-in centre for children is also housed next door to the old hospital complex and St Mark's College.

== See also ==
- St Mark's College, Jane Furse
