= Allen Kannemeyer =

Allen John Kannemeyer is a retired Anglican bishop: he was the Bishop of Pretoria since 2016. until the 22 February 2025.

The 11th Bishop of Pretoria, he was born 21 December 1959 in Mossel Bay. Kannemeyer was educated at St Paul's Theological College. He was ordained deacon on 15 December 1985; and priest on 27 August 1986.

In 1987 he spent a year in the UK as an USPG exchange student. From 1987 until 2000, he served at parishes in Mossel Bay and George. From 2001 he has served the Diocese of Pretoria at Sunnyside and Irene and as an archdeacon.

== Notes ==
Anglican Church of Southern Africa titles
Preceded by Johannes Thomas Seoka	Bishop of Pretoria; 2016–	Incumbent
