= Anglican Diocese of Pretoria =

Diocese of Pretoria Dioecesis Praetoriensis

Location
- Ecclesiastical province: Southern Africa

Statistics
- Parishes: 61

Information
- Rite: Anglican
- Cathedral: Cathedral Church of St. Alban the Martyr in Pretoria

Current leadership
- Bishop: Vicentia Kgabe

Website
- https://www.pretoriadiocese.org.za

The Diocese of Pretoria is a diocese of the Anglican Church of Southern Africa. It is divided into seven archdeaconries and has 61 parishes.

== History ==
The diocese originally covered the whole of the South African Republic, which later became the Transvaal province of South Africa. In 1922 the Diocese of Johannesburg, covering the Southern Transvaal, was formed. In the 1980s and 1990s several new dioceses were formed.

The northernmost part of the diocese covered what is today the Limpopo Province. Suffragan Bishops were often based at Christ Church, Polokwane (then, Pietersburg) to oversee the mission work of the church. In 1957 Bishop Robert Selby Taylor decided to make Pietersburg the centre of the Archdeaconry of the North. In the 1980s a suffragan bishop, John Ruston, was sent to oversee the region. Under his leadership a new diocese was formed. The Anglican Diocese of St Mark the Evangelist was inaugurated in 1987.

== List of the Bishops of Pretoria ==
- Henry Bousfield 1878–1902
- William Carter 1902–1909
- Michael Furse 1909–1920
- Neville Talbot 1920–1933
- Wilfrid Parker 1933–1950
  - in 1938, Norman Lang, Assistant Bishop of Peterborough, England, was also an assistant bishop in Pretoria
- Robert Selby Taylor 1951–1959
- Edward Knapp-Fisher 1960–1974
- Michael Nuttall 1975–1982
- Richard Kraft 1982–1998
  - John Ruston, Suffragan Bishop bef.1983–1990 (for St Mark's area until 1987)
- Johannes Seoka 1998–2016
- Allen John Kannemeyer (Note: consecrated 14 May 2015) 2016–2025
- Vicentia Kgabe 2026-

== Coat of arms ==
Arms of the Diocese of Pretoria

The diocese assumed arms around the time of its inception : Per fess Gules and Azure, a fess Argent between in chief a lion passant Or supporting a staff proper flying therefrom the banner of St George, and in base an anchor erect Or.

By 1889, the diocese had added a green border to the arms, possibly to reflect the colours of the South African Republic's national flag. It removed the border after the republic had become a British colony again in 1902, and changed the upper half of the shield to blue. In this form, the arms were granted by the College of Arms in 1954, and registered at the Bureau of Heraldry in 1964.
