= Michael Lubbock =

British military officer and businessman (1906–1989)

Colonel Michael Ronald Lubbock, MBE, (31 May 1906 – March 1989) was a British military officer and businessman.

== Early life and education ==
Lubbock was the son of Cecil Lubbock (1872–1956) and Edith Furse (1867–1960), daughter of Rev. Charles Furse was Archdeacon of Westminster. He was a great-grandson of Sir John William Lubbock, 3rd Baronet, and was the nephew of Lt.-Gen. Sir William Furse, the artist Charles Wellington Furse, and The Rt Rev Bolton Michael Furse.

Lubbock was educated at Eton College and Trinity College, Oxford, England. He graduated from Oxford University with the degree of Master of Arts in philosophy, political history and economics.

== Career ==
From 1927 to 1943 he had his first job in a London merchant bank; and then became executive assistant to the governor of the Hudson's Bay Company, spending 1936–37 at the Canadian head office and travelling extensively throughout Canada, including the Western Arctic.

He fought in World War II, where he was mentioned in despatches three times. He gained the rank of colonel in the service of the Royal Signals (Territorial Army). He was invested as Member of the Order of the British Empire in 1942. He was decorated with the Order of George I.

== United Nations ==
In 1945–46, after reaching the rank of colonel in the British Army, he became head of the UNRRA Mission (health, refugees, children, social welfare); and moved to UNRRA European headquarters in London for six months, before becoming the first paid staff member of UNICEF in Washington, D.C. in January 1947. He left UNICEF in June to join the newly formed U.N. Appeal for Children, which he managed and developed in fourteen European countries in 1947–48.

When the Appeal was brought to an end, he became a full-time director of the Bank of London and South America. During 1948–1959 he travelled each year throughout Latin America, visiting the bank's branches.

In 1960, he was asked to be the executive deputy chairman of the Peruvian Corporation, a British company which ran the two major railways of Peru, later living in Peru in 1965–1968.

In 1968, Lubbock returned to Canada to create the Canadian Association for Latin America, a centre of research, information and guidance to Canadian companies and others wishing to develop their interests in Latin America, and a growing link with Latin American governments and businessmen. He was its executive director until 1976.

== Personal life ==
He first married Diana Beatrice Crawley, daughter of Henry Ernest Crawley, in May 1929 and had 5 children: Jeremy, Judith, Jessica, Joanna and John. They were divorced in 1956, and Diana died in 1976.

From 1938 to 1940 he had a romantic affair with Lady Alexandra Metcalfe.

His second marriage was to Inga Olga de Rudez in 1957, and they had one child, Inga. They were divorced in 1975.

His final marriage was to Elizabeth Christina Sutherland in 1976.

Lubbock founded the Canadian charity WaterCan/EauVive in 1987, after research about clean water issues in developing countries. He was WaterCan's first honorary chairman.

He died in Ottawa in 1989.
