= Paul Furse =

Royal Navy Rear Admiral (1904–1978)

Rear-Admiral Paul Furse CB OBE FIMechE FLS VMH
- Born: 13 October 1904; Frimley, Surrey, England
- Died: 8 October 1978 (aged 73); Smarden, Kent, England
- Children: John R. Furse (1935-2018)
- Relatives: uncle, Sir William Thomas Furse; uncle, Rev. Michael Bolton Furse; great aunt Marianne North
- Military career
- Allegiance: United Kingdom
- Branch: Royal Navy
- Service years: 1918–1959
- Rank: Rear-Admiral
- Conflicts: World War Two (1939-1945)
- Awards: Knight Grand Cross of the Order of the Bath; Officer of the Order of the British Empire; Victoria Medal of Honour
- Other work: Botanical illustrator, author and plant hunter

John Paul Wellington Furse, CB, OBE, FIMechE, FLS, VMH (13 October 1904 – 8 October 1978) was an English naval officer who became a rear-admiral before he retired. He was a painter and botanical illustrator and later a plant hunter with his wife for the Royal Horticultural Society.

== Family ==
John Paul Wellington Furse was born in Frimley, Surrey, England. He was the son of portrait painter Charles Wellington Furse and (a British nursing and military administrator) Dame Katharine Furse (formerly Katharine Symonds). His father died in the same week Furse was born. He had 4 uncles and 4 aunts. Including; Rev. Michael Bolton Furse (12 October 1870 – 18 June 1955), an Anglican bishop and Sir William Thomas Furse (21 April 1865 – 31 May 1953), an army lieutenant general.

His great-aunt was the botanical artist Marianne North (24 October 1830 – 30 August 1890).

As a child, Furse spent a lot of time in the Alps with his family.

His brother, Peter Reynolds Furse, was born on 29 October 1901. He became a sub-lieutenant on 15 May 1915. Peter enlisted into the Royal Navy in 1918 (during World War 1), he was a cartographer. In 1922, he graduated from Emmanuel College, University of Cambridge. On 25 June 1931, he married Barbara Elizabeth Ross, they then lived in Nairobi, Kenya, and had a daughter Elizabeth Furse in 1936. They then moved to Cape Town, South Africa. During World War II, he returned to the Royal Navy and was eventually made lieutenant commander. After the war, he returned to South Africa before they eventually retired to Hampton, New Brunswick, Canada, since his wife was originally Canadian born. His daughter Elizabeth Furse (13 October 1936 – 18 April 2021) was a member of the United States House of Representatives from 1993 to 1999.

Furse married Cicely Rathbone (1899–1991), on 7 April 1929 in London, England. She was the daughter of Frederick Rathbone. Cicely was often known as Polly. His mother, Katharine, had gone with Polly and Paul to Switzerland later in 1929.

Furse and Polly both spent their spare time painting (a Furse family past-time), with often visiting gardens for inspiration. They both mounted an exhibition of their work in 1937, but all the paintings they displayed at the show were lost during the Blitz. Furse had also exhibited paintings at RHS shows in the 1930s.

On 10 June 1935, Paul and Polly had a child, John R. Furse. Known as "Chris", he was born in Kent. He also joined the Navy, and became an engineer, like his father. He later married an Australian girl, was assigned to an aircraft carrier in Borneo, and then returned to greet his son Ralf. He had two years as senior engineer on HMS Ark Royal. Later he was a staff engineer on HMS Ajax (his first frigate). John R. Furse wrote a book Elephant Island: An Antarctic Expedition published on 16 October 1979, with the royalties going to the RGS. He died on 30 October 2018.

== Naval career ==
He was commissioned into the Royal Navy in 1918, when he was just aged 13. He then started his naval education at the Royal Naval College, Osborne, on the Isle of Wight, then he went to Royal Naval College, Dartmouth, in Devon. Then ranked as a midshipman, he went onto the Royal Naval Engineering College in Keyham, Leicestershire in 1922, to study engineering.

In 1925, he became a sub-lieutenant and then in 1926, he was posted to the aircraft carrier HMS Eagle, which was initially assigned to the Mediterranean Fleet.

In 1927, he became a lieutenant, He then served with HM Submarines between 1927 and 1939. In 1928, he was an engineer on HMS Olympus, a newly built Odin-class submarine, which was commissioned into service on 14 June 1930 and then based out of China Station.

In May 1932, he was an engineer on HMS Colombo (a light cruiser) with the Mediterranean Fleet. He then was posted in December 1932 to HMS Dolphin, a submarine depot ship. In 1934, he was Assistant Engineer to the Rear-Admiral. In 1935, he was promoted to lieutenant commander (Lt.Cdr.)

In 1937, he was moved to HMS Medway (another submarine depot ship), part of 4 Submarine Flotilla, based at China.

In December 1939, he was promoted to commander Cdr. He then served during World War Two between 1939 and 1945; he was a senior engineering officer on board HMS Sandhurst (a converted merchant ship) in 1939.

Then he became an assistant naval attaché for Europe and the Americas between 1940 and 1943, with HMS President. As an assistant naval attache, Furse wrote two documents entitled 'British Naval agent in Scandinavia, Mar–Apr 1940' and a note on a reported rumour of a German invasion of the UK, 16–17 September 1940.

He then served with 5 and 6 Submarine Flotillas, between 1943 and 1946. He was awarded (Officer of the Order of the British Empire) OBE in June 1946.

He returned to HMS President between 1947 and 1950. In December 1948, he was promoted to captain. In 1951, he was chief staff officer to the rear-admiral of HMS Condor, a Royal Naval Air Station in Arbroath, Angus, Scotland.

In September 1955, he was made a rear-admiral. Then he became director of aircraft maintenance and repair for the Admiralty between 1955 and 1958. based on HMS President.

In 1957, he had his portrait taken by Walter Bird, dressed in his Royal Navy uniform for the National Portrait Gallery archives.

He was then appointed a Companion of the Order of the Bath (CB) on 1 January 1958. His last post was of director general of the Aircraft Department for the Admiralty between 1958 and 1959, based at HMS President.

In May 1959, Furse wrote in the Journal of the Royal Aeronautical Society, 'The Operation of Naval Aircraft and Aircraft Carriers', Vol. 63 on page 301, "in support of allied landings and coastal operations". He then retired from Royal Navy in 1959, when he was 55 years old.

== After naval retirement ==
His first post-retirement expedition with his wife, Polly was to north eastern Turkey and Iran in 1960, they found specimens of Cyclamen elegans. They drove from England in a Land Rover packed full of equipment to explore the mountain passes, that had hardly been seen before. They went with a party of explorers including Patrick Synge, the then editor of 'Journal of the Royal Horticultural Society'. The party travelled over 6,000 miles in 2 months exploring. This first trip resulted in just over 900 collections of plants. Including the yellow crown imperial, Fritillaria raddeana Regel (from the Kopet Dagh on the borders of Turkmenia or Iran), Iris afghanica Wendelbo (from the Salang Pass, north of Kabul), and also from the Black Sea coast, Iris lazica Albov.

The Furses returned to Turkey and Iran in 1962. They both collected more than 3,100 plant specimens, including bulbs of Fritillaria uva-vulpis which were then brought into cultivation under that name.

In 1964, they carried out a botanical expedition in conjunction again with the Royal Horticultural Society botanist Patrick Synge, to Afghanistan, they got as far as the Hindu Kush and the Wakhan Corridor. They then returned to Afghanistan in 1966. They found more specimens of Iris afghanica and then realised it was a new species. Both of their 1964 and 1966 expeditions had resulted in the collection of nearly 4,200 specimens.

Paul Furse was awarded 4 RHS Gold medals of his paintings of plants between 1964 and 1968.

He was awarded the Victoria Medal of Honour by the Royal Horticultural Society, 1965.

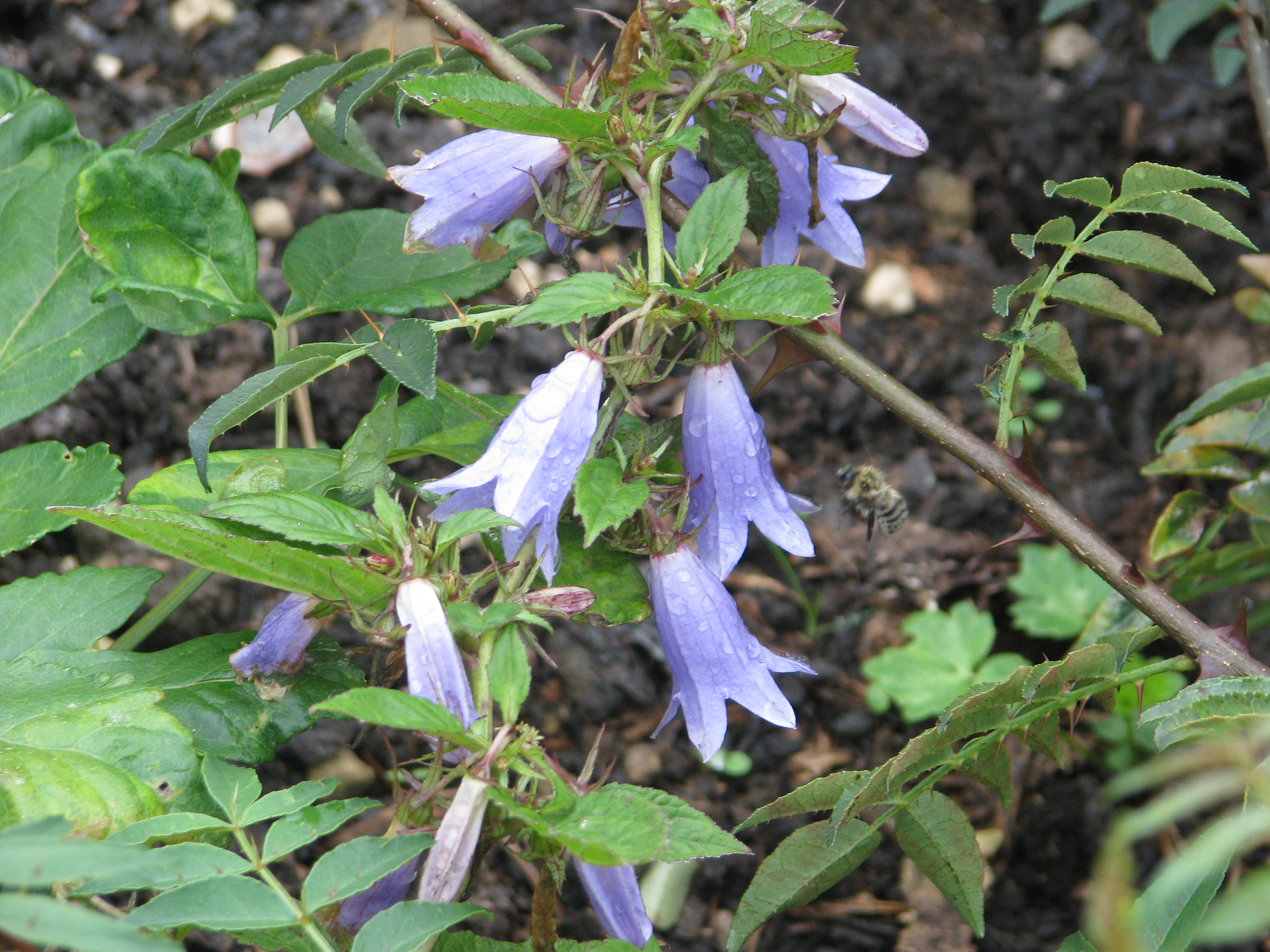
Campanula 'Paul Furse' which was named after him

Furse had a passion and specialist knowledge for fritillarias, and also for irises, daffodils, tulips, crocuses, colchicums, lilies and other bulbous plants. It is claimed that Furse had illustrated nearly every known species of lily.

The Furses' plant hunting expeditions were recounted in the Journal of the Royal Horticultural Society, and some of their collections have been debated in The Lily Yearbook and The Iris Yearbook, both published by the RHS. Botanists working on the 'Flora of Turkey' and 'Flora Iranica' have also studied the dried collections and Kew holds Paul Furse's very detailed field notes, his botanical paintings, letters and various specimens. Kew also stored over 700 of Paul's illustrations.

There are over 800 water coloured illustrations by Furse stored in the Lindley Art Collection in the Lindley Library.

Furse was also vice-chairman of the Lily Group (within the RHS).

Patrick Synge expeditions, including those to Turkey with Paul Furse and also to Nepal with Colville Barclay were documented in his 1973 book, In Search of Flowers.

== Plant honours ==
Furse was made a Fellow of the Linnean Society of London in January 1964.

In 1965, Furse was awarded by The British Iris Society, the Foster Memorial Plaque (named after Sir Michael Foster).

Campanula 'Paul Furse' (a blue-violet flowers on arching stems with a branching habit) was named after him.

He was also remembered in Eremurus furseorum Wendelbo (from Afghanistan), published in 1966, Fessia furseorum (Meikle) Speta (from NE. Afghanistan), originally Scilla furseorum Meikle, Bot. Mag. 176: t. 507, (published in 1967), and also Sempervivum furseorum, (from NE. Turkey), published in 2011.

Iris furseorum T. Hall & Seisums, which was collected in N.E. Afghanistan by Paul and Polly Furse in 1966 and has been maintained in cultivation. It was first published in Curtis's Botanical Magazine Vol.31 on page 257 in 2014.

His illustrations from the Lindley Library, were displayed in 'The Royal Horticultural Society Pocket Diary 2021'.

== Publications ==
- Furse, J. P. W., (1963), Irises in Iran and Turkey, The Iris Year Book 1963, p. 135-144.
- Furse, J. P. W., (1965), Irises in Iran and Afghanistan, The Iris Year Book 1965, p. 100-112.
- Furse, J. P. W., (1966), Journal of the Royal Horticultural Society 91: fig. 8. Iris platyptera as 'Old Smokey'.
- Furse, J. P. W., (1966), The Iris Year Book 1965, p. 106. The British Iris Society. Iris platyptera as 'Old Smokey'.
- Furse, J. P. W., (1968), Iris in Turkey, Iran and Afghanistan., The Iris Year Book 1968, p. 63-77. The British Iris Society. Iris doabensis as 'Doab Gold'. p. 71
- Napier, Elspeth (ed), The Lily Year Book for 1971 (includes two group discussions - the first on Hostas with contributions from Chris Brickell, G.S. Thomas and William Stearn, and the second discussion on Scillas and Chionodoxas led by Paul Furse)
- Furse, J. P. W., (1971), Iris species in the wild. In International Rock Garden Plant Conference, 4th, Harrogate, 1971. The world of rock plants: 46–49.
- Furse, J. P. W., (1971), Oncocyclus and Regelia irises in Turkey, Iran and Afghanistan. Iris Year Book 1971, 119–132.
- Furse, J. P. W. (1972), Iris Reticulata Section,
- Furse, J. P. W., (1973), Iris reticulata section or the genus Iridodictyum. Iris Yearbook 1972, 103–111.
- Furse, J. P. W., (1975), Irises in Iran and Afghanistan, 1964. Aril Society International Yearbook 1975: 52–55.
- Furse, J. P. W., (1975), Irises in Iran and Turkey. Aril Society International Yearbook 1975, 55–58.
- Quart. Bull. Alpine Garde Soc. V.45, page 112-119 1977,
- Times 12 October 1978,
- Iris Yearbook 1978 pages 15–16,
- Quart. Bull. Alpine Garde Soc. V.47 page 86, 1979,
- Lilies 1978/79 page 88-89

== Death ==
Furse died on 8 October 1978 at age 73 in Kent, England.

He was buried in Smarden, in the St Michael the Archangel Churchyard with his wife Polly of Hegg Hill House.

== Other sources ==
- M. Alam, 2009, "Plant Collectors in Afghanistan", Bulletin de la Société vaudoise des Sciences naturelles, 91(3): 330
- K. Strange, 2007, "Paul Furse and his Plant Collections at Kew", Curtis's Botanical Magazine, 24(1): 71–80.
- References Vegter, H.I., Index Herb. Coll. N-R (1983): 984;
