= Charles Furse =

Charles Furse may refer to:

- Charles Wellington Furse (1868–1904), English painter
- Charles Furse (priest) (1821–1900), Archdeacon of Westminster
