= John Furse =

John Furse may refer to:

- John H. Furse, (1880–1907), officer in the US Navy
- John Paul Wellington Furse, English admiral, botanical illustrator and plant hunter
