= Arethusa Leigh-White =

Arethusa Flora Gartside Leigh-White (née Hawker) (3 January 1885 – 1959) was a British guiding and girl scout leader. She was the second World Association Director, whose nine years in office ended in 1947.

Leigh-White had the difficult years of World War II to contend with, and spent some time in the Western Hemisphere building Girl Guiding there. The immediate postwar reconstruction in Europe came under her guidance, and she and J. S. Wilson had to address and adjust policy accordingly.

== Tour of Europe in June 1945 ==
In June 1945, Arethusa and Olave Baden-Powell toured Europe together, including a private Audience with the Pope in the Vatican on 7 June 1945.

== See also ==
- World Scout Committee

World Association of Girl Guides and Girl Scouts
Preceded by Dame Katharine Furse	World Association Director; 1938 — 1947	Succeeded by Elizabeth Fry
