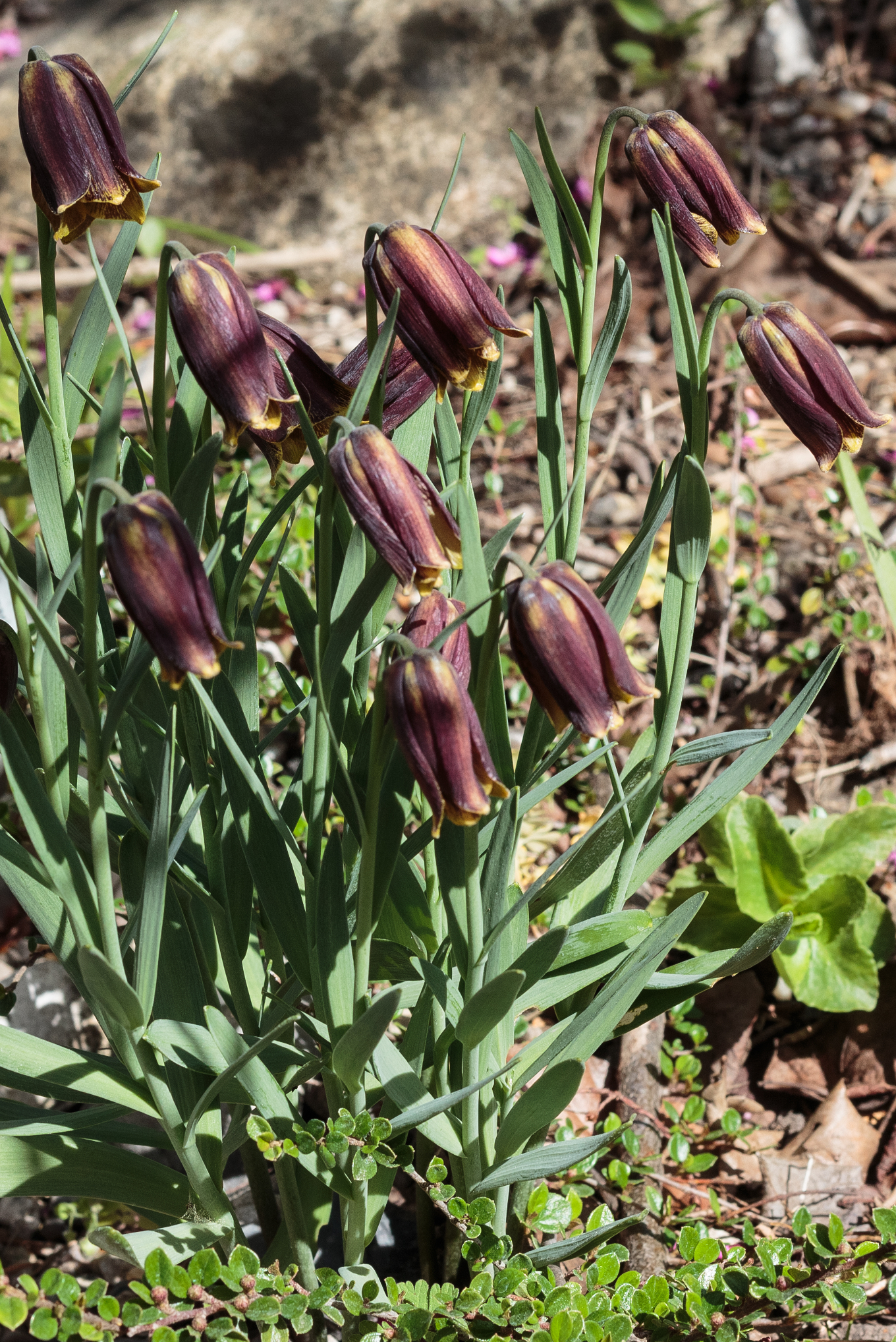

Scientific classification
- Kingdom: Plantae
- Clade: Tracheophytes
- Clade: Angiosperms
- Clade: Monocots
- Order: Liliales
- Family: Liliaceae
- Subfamily: Lilioideae
- Genus: Fritillaria
- Species: F. assyriaca

Binomial name
- Fritillaria assyriaca Baker

= Fritillaria assyriaca =

Species of flowering plant

Fritillaria assyriaca is a bulbous herbaceous perennial plant occurring in a region stretching from Turkey to Iran. It is a species in the genus Fritillaria, in the lily family Liliaceae. It is placed in the subgenus Fritillaria.

== Description ==
Fritillaria assyriaca is one of the more variable Fritillaria species. Flowers are 1–2 per stem, occasionally 5, narrow and campanulate tubular, perianth segments variable usually greenish or dusky reddish or purplish brown with green fascia, occasionally striped, yellowish inside, and sometimes reflexed (recurved) towards the tip. The outer segments measure 15-25×4–5 mm and are narrowly oblong. The inner segments measuring 5–10 mm in width are usually obtuse (blunted at the tip). The nectaries measure 2–4×1 mm and are linear-lanceolate and are about 1 mm above the base of the segment. The style is stout, and may be 5–10 mm long but usually 7–8 mm and 1.5–2 mm in diameter. It is usually undivided or slightly lobed at its apex. The stamens consist of filaments which are 5–9 mm in length and are swollen and papillose with anthers that are 4–6 mm long. The capsule is about 26 mm long, cylindrical, and not winged.

The leaves are usually 4–6 per stem, but may be up to 12. The lowest of these measuring 3-9×0.3-1.9 cm, sometimes opposite and ovate-lanceolate, while the remainder are shorter, alternate, usually canaliculated (channeled), especially when young, linear, and glaucous. Bulbs up to 3 cm in diameter, with stolons or bulbils frequently present. The stem varies between 4–20 cm in height but may reach 35 cm when bearing fruit, and may frequently have papillae present at ground level.

Fritillaria assyriaca, a tetraploid, has a very large genome. With approximately 127 pg (130 Gb (Giga base pairs)), it was for a long time the largest known genome, exceeding the largest vertebrate animal genome known to date, that of the marbled lungfish (Protopterus aethiopicus), in size.

== Taxonomy ==
The specimen that Baker named in 1874 was collected by Haussknecht in 1867, from a locale thought to be in south-eastern Turkey. It had been confused with another species, now known as F. uva-vulpis Rix. Previously it was referred to as F. assyriaca hort. till Rix proposed F. uva-vulpis in 1974 to avoid confusion. However, many plants offered for commercial sale as F. assyriaca today are in fact F. uvs-vulpis.

== Distribution and habitat ==
One of the more widespread species in the genus, F. assyriaca is found from central Turkey in the Ankara region, east to Agri in the far eastern part of Turkey, and south towards Shiraz, Iran, and often occupies disturbed habitats.

== Ecology ==
Flowering occurs from March to May.

== Bibliography ==
- Baker, J. G. (1874). "Revision of the Genera and Species of Tulipeae". Botanical Journal of the Linnean Society. xiv (76). F. assyriaca p. 265. doi:10.1111/j.1095-8339.1874.tb00314.x.
- Kiani, Mahmoud; Mohammadi, Shirin; Babaei, Alireza; Sefidkon, Fatemeh; Naghavi, Mohamad Reza; Ranjbar, Mojtaba; Razavi, Seyed Ali; Saeidi, Keramatollah; Jafari, Hadi; Asgari, Davoud; Potter, Daniel (September 2017). "Iran supports a great share of biodiversity and floristic endemism for Fritillaria spp. (Liliaceae): A Review". Plant Diversity. 39 (5): 245–262. doi:10.1016/j.pld.2017.09.002. PMC 6112302. PMID 30159518.
- Rix, E. M. (1974). "Notes on Fritillaria (Liliaceae) in the Eastern Mediterranean Region, I & II". Kew Bulletin. 29 (4): 633–654. doi:10.2307/4108130. JSTOR 4108130.
- Rix, E. M. (1977). "Fritillaria L. (Liliaceae) in Iran" (PDF). Iranian Journal of Botany. 1 (2): 75–95.
- TPL (2013). "The Plant List 1.1: Fritillaria assyriaca Baker". Royal Botanic Gardens, Kew and Missouri Botanical Garden.
- "Rare Japanese plant has largest genome known to science". Science Daily. 7 October 2010.
- "Fritillaria assyriaca". Fritillaria species: A. Fritillaria Group, Alpine Garden Society.
