= Fight the Good Fight =

Christian song

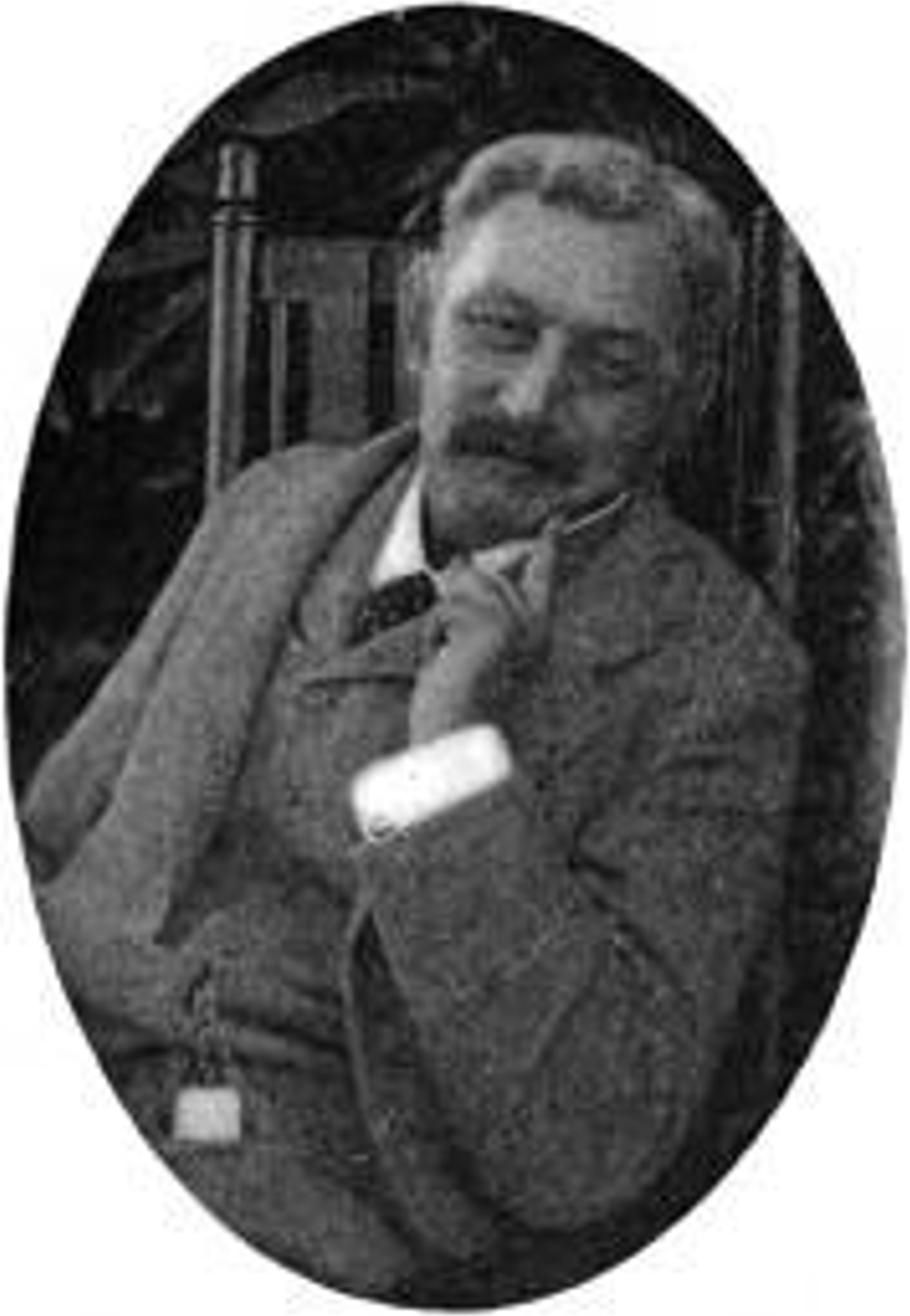
- William Boyd
- Genre: Hymn
- Written: 1863
- Text: John Samuel Bewley Monsell
- Based on: 1 Timothy 6:12
- Meter: 6.6.6.6.8.8
- Melody: "Pentecost" by William Boyd, "Duke Street"

"Fight the Good Fight" is a traditional, classic favorite hymn and Christian song. It was written by John Samuel Bewley Monsell and published in Hymns of Love and Praise for the Church’s Year (1863). It is sung to the tune Pentecost, written in 1864 by William Boyd.

The hymn is based on the King James Bible's version of Paul's First Epistle to Timothy, Chapter 6, verse 12: "Fight the good fight of faith, lay hold on eternal life, whereunto thou art also called, and hast professed a good profession before many witnesses." The hymn lyrics urge the listener to "Fight the good fight," "lay hold on life," "run the straight race," "cast care aside", and "faint not nor fear."
