= Thomas Monsell =

Thomas Bewley Monsell (1763–1846) was an Anglican priest in the 19th century.

Monsell was born in Limerick and educated at Trinity College, Dublin. He was Archdeacon of Derry from 1820 until his death in November 1846. He was also [[[rebendary]] of St Michael's at Christ Church Cathedral, Dublin from 1829 until 1837; and Precentor of Christ Church from 1837 until his death.

His son was the hymnist John Samuel Bewley Monsell and his daughter the botanical artist Diana Conyngham Ellis.
