= Katharine Furse =

British nursing and military administrator

Dame Katharine Furse GBE RRC
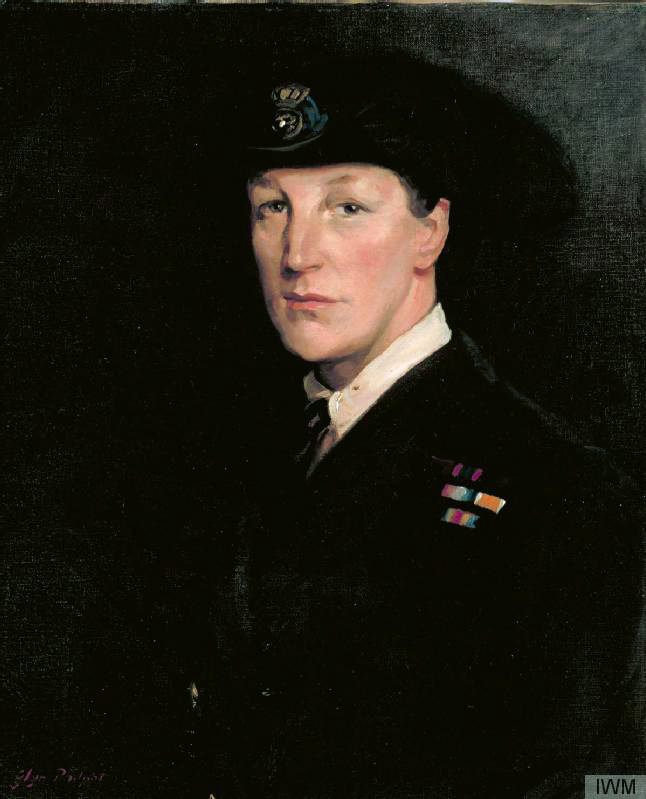
- Portrait by Glyn Philpot, 1920
- Born: Katharine Symonds; 23 November 1875; Bristol, Great Britain
- Died: 25 November 1952 (aged 77); London, Great Britain
- Spouse: Charles Wellington Furse (m. 1900; died 1904)
- Relatives: John Addington Symonds (father); Marianne North (aunt); Elizabeth Furse (granddaughter)
- Military career
- Allegiance: United Kingdom
- Branch: Women's Royal Naval Service
- Rank: Director
- Commands: Women's Royal Naval Service (1917–19)
- Conflicts: First World War
- Awards: Dame Grand Cross of the Order of the British Empire; Royal Red Cross
- Other work: Director of the World Association of Girl Guides and Girl Scouts (1928–38)

Dame Katharine Furse, GBE, RRC (née Symonds; 23 November 1875 – 25 November 1952) was a British nursing and military administrator. She led the British Red Cross Voluntary Aid Detachment force during the First World War, and served as the inaugural Director of the Women's Royal Naval Service (1917–19). Furse was also the first Director of the World Association of Girl Guides and Girl Scouts (1928–38).

== Early life and family ==
Furse was born in Bristol, England, on 23 November 1875, the daughter of poet and critic John Addington Symonds and Janet Catherine North. Her aunt was the painter Marianne North. Educated by governesses and her mother, Furse spent most of her early life in Switzerland and Italy. Furse married the painter Charles Wellington Furse at St. Margaret, Westminster 16 October 1900; her husband died 16 October 1904 aged 36, leaving her with two young sons: Peter Reynolds Furse, b. Farnham, October 29, 1901, and Paul Furse, b. Farnham, October 13, 1904.

== Military career ==
In 1909 Furse joined the British Red Cross Voluntary Aid Detachment attached to the Territorial Army. In 1911, she was lodging with Lucy Cane and family at 66 Elm Park Gardens, Chelsea.

On the outbreak of the First World War she was chosen to head the first Voluntary Aid Detachment (VAD) unit to be sent to France. Furse realised that the existing number of nurses would prove totally inadequate to deal with the enormous amount of work which might be expected, and in September 1914 she proceeded to France with a number of assistants, these forming the nucleus of the VAD force.

In January 1915 she returned to England, and the VAD work was then officially recognised as a department of the Red Cross organisation and she was placed in charge of the VAD Department in London. She received the Royal Red Cross and was named a Lady of Grace of the Order of St John of Jerusalem in 1916, and was appointed a Dame Grand Cross of the Order of the British Empire in June 1917. Although she considered it a great success being head of the Voluntary Aid Detachment, Furse was unhappy about her lack of power to introduce reforms. In November 1917, she and several of her senior colleagues resigned due to a dispute over the living conditions of the VAD volunteers and the Red Cross refusal to co-ordinate with the Woman's Army group.

Furse was immediately offered the post as director of the Women's Royal Naval Service (WRNS), this was equivalent to the rank of rear admiral. The Royal Navy was the first of the armed forces to recruit women and since 1916 the Women's Royal Naval Service took over the role of cooks, clerks, wireless telegraphists, code experts and electricians. The women were so successful that other organisations such as the Women's Army Auxiliary Corps (WAAC) and the Women's Royal Air Force (WRAF) were also established.

== Post-war ==
After the war, Furse joined the travel agency of Sir Henry Lunn (later known as Lunn Polly). Working mainly in Switzerland, she became an expert skier and did a great deal to popularise the sport with British tourists. Her achievements were acknowledged when she became President of the Ladies' Ski Club.

In 1920, Furse formed the Association of Wrens and this led to her becoming head of the Sea Rangers (formerly known as the Sea Guides), and for ten years, from 1928 to 1938, was director of the World Association of Girl Guides and Girl Scouts, whose constitution she drafted.

Furse's autobiography, Hearts and Pomegranates, was published in 1940. Her last public appearance was at the Conference of Former Scouts in London in September 1952. Furse died at University College Hospital in London two months later in late November 1952, and two days after her 77th birthday and her wealth at death was £10,996.

== Legacy ==
There is a blue plaque in Furse's honour at her birthplace, Clifton Hill House, Lower Clifton Hill, Hotwells, in Bristol. It was unveiled on 7 September 2017, following a campaign by the Association of Wrens. The building is now a hall of residence for Bristol University.

Her granddaughter was U.S. Congresswoman Elizabeth Furse.

World Association of Girl Guides and Girl Scouts
New title	World Association Director; 1928—1938	Succeeded by Arethusa Leigh-White
