= Diana Conyngham Ellis =

Northern Irish botanical painter

- Born: Diana Monsell; 1813; Ireland
- Died: 4 May 1851 (aged 37/38)
- Known for: botanical painting

Diana Conyngham Ellis (née Monsell) (1813 - 4 May 1851) was a botanical artist from Ireland.

== Life ==
Diana Monsell was born, most probably in County Londonderry, in 1813. She was the eldest daughter of the four children of the Archdeacon of Derry, Thomas Bewley Monsell, and Jane Rae. Her brother was the clergyman and hymn-writer, John Samuel Bewley Monsell. She married Conyngham Ellis, her first cousin, on 29 December 1842 at Dunloe Church. Initially a barrister, Conyngham Ellis left the profession to become a vicar, serving in Cranbourne, Windsor, Berkshire. Ellis died aged 37 or 38, on 4 May 1851. The book by Ellis as Mrs Conyngham Ellis, Conversations on human nature for the young, appears to have been printed posthumously.

A watercolour portrait of Ellis by Frederick William Burton is in the collections of the National Gallery of Ireland.

== Artistic work ==
Ellis' body of work consists of 68 flower and foliage water colour drawings. It is not known if Ellis received any form of training, though her work is typical of its time. Her studies were of common local plants, mostly those found in fields and hedgerows, such as primroses, bluebells, and violets. The work has been lauded for its accuracy and realism.

The mounted album of her work is held in the collections of the National Gallery of Ireland. Burton commented on her work: "I have not for a long time seen anything that gave me so much pleasure to dwell on ... they make my own work appear rude and false that I am more than ever alive to my defects."
