= Michael Furse =

British Anglican bishop (1870–1956)

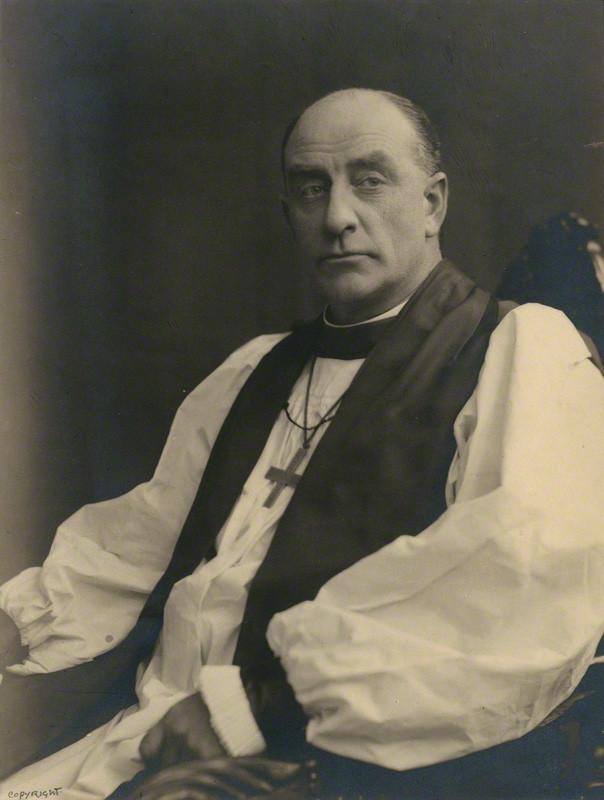
Furse in the 1920s

Michael Bolton Furse, KCMG (born Bolton Michael Furse; 12 October 1870 – 18 June 1955) was a British Anglican bishop in the first half of the 20th century.

Born in 1870 in Staines, Middlesex, Furse was the fourth son of Ven. Charles Furse (born Johnson), Archdeacon of Westminster, and Jane Diana Monsell, second daughter of John Samuel Bewley Monsell, vicar of Egham. His elder brothers included the sculptor John Henry Monsell Furse, Lt.-Gen. Sir William Furse and the artist Charles Wellington Furse.

He was educated at Eton and Trinity College, Oxford, he was ordained in 1897. He was Fellow and Dean of his old college then Archdeacon of Johannesburg. On 30 June 1903, Furse married Frances Josephine Redfield, daughter of the late James Redfield of Virginia, Captain in the United States army. The wedding took place in the Chapel of Trinity College, Oxford. In 1904 the Herbert Baker-designed house, Bishopskop was built for him. In 1909 he was elevated to the episcopate as Bishop of Pretoria, a post he held for 11 years. The Jane Furse Memorial Hospital was built in memory of his daughter, Jane, who died of scarlet fever in 1918. In 1920 he was translated to St Albans, retiring in 1944. In 1931, he delivered a sermon to the General Convention of the Episcopal Church in the U.S. on the subject of divorce. He died on 18 June 1955.

Anglican Church of Southern Africa titles
Preceded by William Marlborough Carter	Bishop of Pretoria; 1909 – 1920	Succeeded by Neville Stuart Talbot
Church of England titles
Preceded by Edgar Jacob	Bishop of St Albans; 1920 – 1944	Succeeded by Philip Henry Loyd
