= William Furse =

19th and 20th Century British Army officer

Lieutenant-General Sir William Furse KCB KCMG DSO
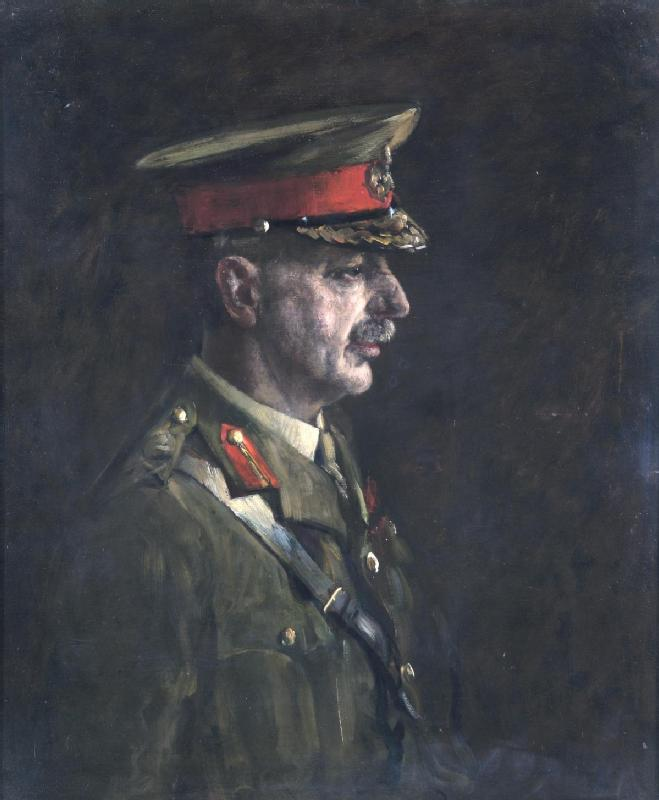
- Born: 21 April 1865; Staines, Middlesex, England
- Died: 31 May 1953 (aged 88); Buckinghamshire, England
- Spouse: Jean Adelaide Furse
- Children: 4, including Judith Furse and Roger Furse
- Military career
- Allegiance: United Kingdom
- Branch: British Army
- Service years: 1884–1920
- Rank: Lieutenant-General
- Commands: 9th (Scottish) Division
- Conflicts: Second Boer War; First World War
- Awards: Knight Commander of the Order of the Bath; Knight Commander of the Order of St Michael and St George; Distinguished Service Order

Lieutenant-General Sir William Thomas Furse, KCB, KCMG, DSO (21 April 1865 – 31 May 1953) was a senior British Army officer who served as Master-General of the Ordnance during the First World War.

== Early life and family ==
Furse was born in Staines, Middlesex, the second son of the Ven. Charles Furse (born Johnson), Archdeacon of Westminster, and Jane Diana Monsell, second daughter of John Samuel Bewley Monsell, vicar of Egham. He was educated at Eton College and the Royal Military Academy, Woolwich. The artist, Charles Wellington Furse, and the bishop, Rt. Rev. Michael Furse, were his younger brothers.

Furse was the father of the artist and designer Roger Furse and the actress Judith Furse.

== Early military career ==
Furse was commissioned into the Royal Artillery as a lieutenant on 5 July 1884. He was seconded on his appointment to the staff in March 1891 and appointed an aide-de-camp to Lord Roberts from March 1891 to 1893, and was promoted to captain on 30 May 1893. He was seconded from his regiment in order to attend the Staff College, Camberley, from 1896 to 1897.

Furse served during the Second Boer War, being made a deputy assistant adjutant general (DAAG) at army headquarters on 29 June 1900, and was promoted to major on 15 March. He was appointed a Companion of the Distinguished Service Order (DSO) in April 1901.

Following the end of the war in June 1902, Furse was on 15 October appointed DAQMG to the 2nd Army Corps based at Salisbury Plain. In October 1905 he was appointed a DAQMG at army headquarters. While there he was promoted from supernumerary major to major in August 1907. In January 1908, while serving at the Staff College, Camberley, as a general staff officer, grade 2 (GSO2), he was promoted to brevet lieutenant colonel.

Made a lieutenant colonel, dated 24 September 1910, in 1911 he was appointed commander of the 12th (Howitzer) Brigade Royal Field Artillery. In October 1913 he was promoted to colonel, and succeeded Colonel George Milne as general staff officer, grade 1 (GSO1), effectively chief of staff, of the 6th Division.

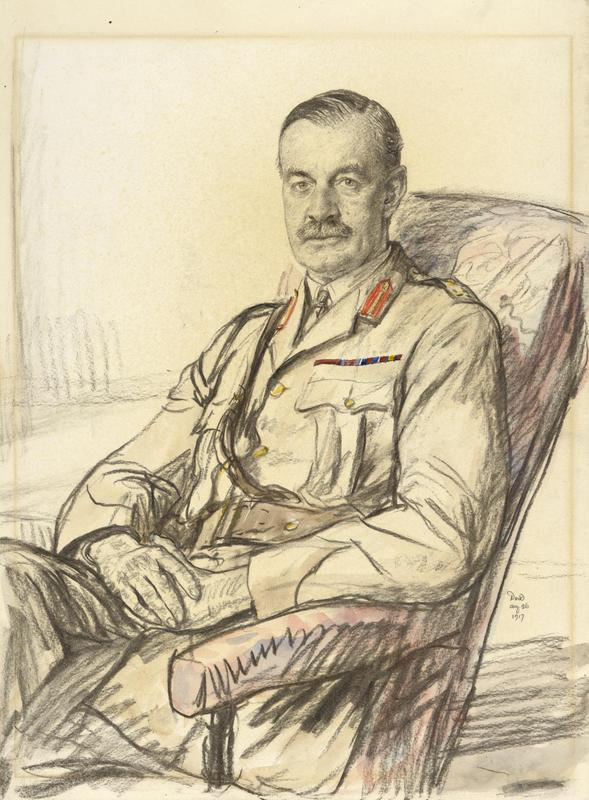
Artwork of Major General William Furse.

== First World War ==
Furse served in the First World War, still with the 6th Division as its GSO1, serving with the British Expeditionary Force (BEF). He was made a temporary brigadier general in January 1915 and became brigadier general, general staff of II Corps of the BEF and in February he was appointed a Companion of the Order of the Bath.

He served in this position until September when he was promoted to the temporary rank of major general, and became general officer commanding (GOC) of the 9th (Scottish) Division of Kitchener's Army on the Western Front. His rank of major general was made substantive in January 1916 "for distinguished service in the Field" and, after leading his division in the Battle of the Somme, he became Master-General of the Ordnance in December; in this capacity he opposed the introduction of the Madsen machine gun, preferring the Lewis gun.

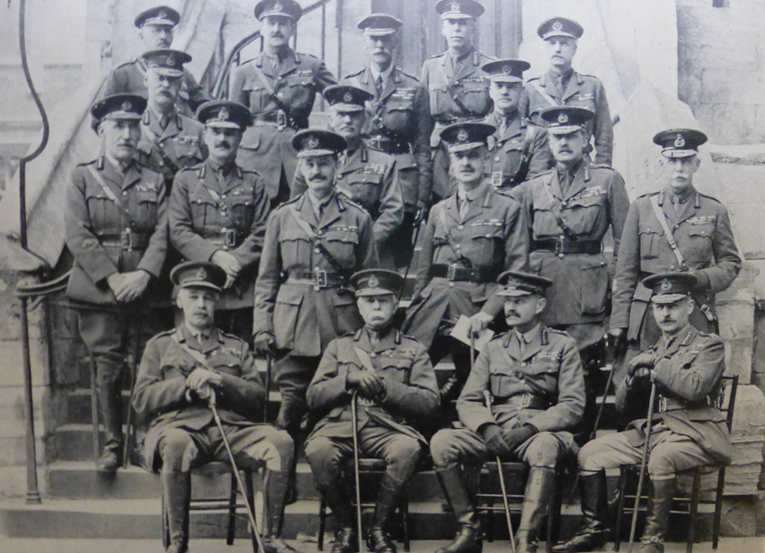
Eighteen Old Etonian generals revisit Eton, May 1919. Lieutenant General Furse is stood in the middle row, fourth from the right.

== Post-war and final years ==
Furse was promoted in January 1919 to substantive lieutenant general in recognition of "valuable services rendered in connection with the War". He was made a colonel commandant of the Royal Artillery in October 1919, and retired from the army in January 1920.

Military offices
Preceded by George Thesiger	GOC 9th (Scottish) Division; 1915–1916	Succeeded by Henry Lukin
Preceded by Sir Stanley von Donop	Master-General of the Ordnance; 1916–1919	Succeeded by Sir John Du Cane
