= Elizabeth Furse =

American politician (1936–2021)

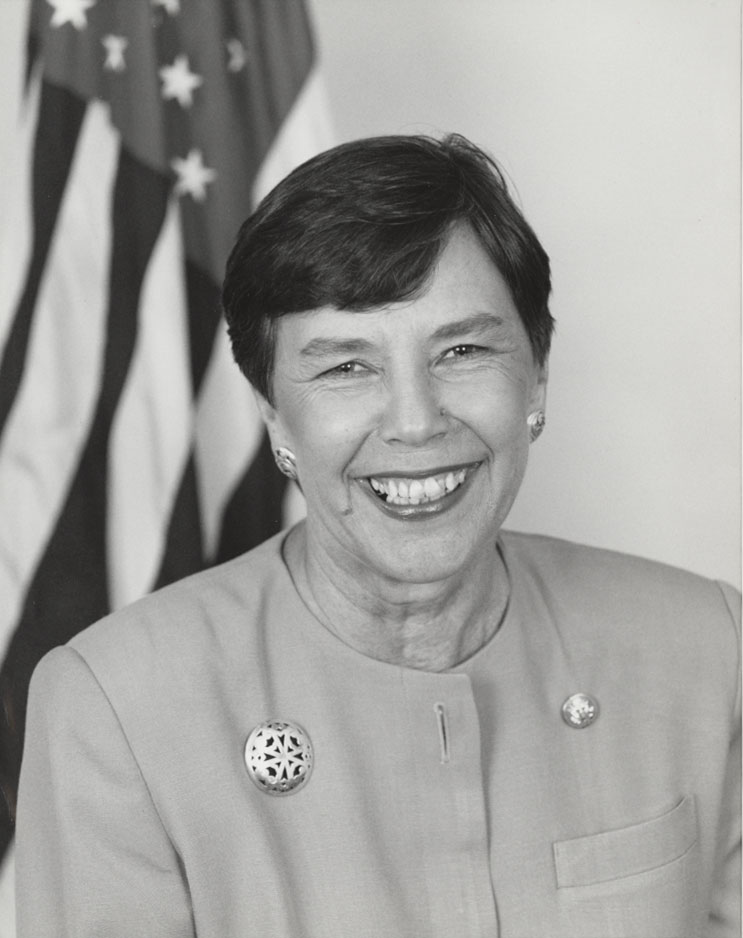

Member of the U.S. House of Representatives from Oregon's 1st district
- In office January 3, 1993 – January 3, 1999
- Preceded by: Les AuCoin
- Succeeded by: David Wu

Personal details
- Born: October 13, 1936 Nairobi, Kenya Colony (present-day Nairobi, Kenya)
- Died: April 18, 2021 (aged 84) Washington County, Oregon, U.S.
- Party: Democratic

Elizabeth Furse (October 13, 1936 – April 18, 2021) was a Kenya Colony-born American small business owner and former faculty member of Portland State University. She was a member of the United States House of Representatives from 1993 to 1999, representing Oregon's 1st congressional district. She was a Democrat, and was the first naturalized U.S. citizen born in Africa to win election to the United States Congress.

== Early years ==
Furse was born in Nairobi, Kenya Colony, to a Canadian mother, Barbara Elizabeth (née Ross), from Regina, Saskatchewan, and a British father, Peter Reynolds Furse. Her paternal grandparents were painter Charles Wellington Furse and nursing and military administrator Dame Katharine Furse GBE RRC. Her maternal grandfather was James Hamilton Ross, a Canadian rancher, Canadian Pacific Railway scout and politician who is credited as being among the first residents of the modern-day town of Moose Jaw, Saskatchewan. She grew up in South Africa. Inspired by her mother, she became an anti-apartheid activist in 1951, joining the first Black Sash demonstrations in Cape Town, South Africa.

She moved to England in 1956, before eventually moving to the United States, settling in Los Angeles, California. While in Los Angeles, she became involved in a women's self-help project in Watts, and with Cesar Chavez's United Farm Workers movement, working to unionize grape farm workers. Moving to Seattle, Washington, in 1968, she became involved in American Indian/Native American rights causes including fishing and treaty rights. She became a United States citizen in 1972. Two years later, she graduated from Evergreen State College with a B.A.

In 1978, she settled in the Portland, Oregon, area, where she attended Northwestern School of Law. After two years of law school, she dropped out and led the efforts of several Oregon-based American Indian/Native American tribes to win federal recognition, successfully lobbying the U.S. Congress to restore federal recognition of the Coquille, Klamath, Lower Umpqua Tribe, Coos Tribe, and Grand Ronde tribes. In 1986, she co-founded the Portland-based Oregon Peace Institute, establishing a mission to develop and disseminate conflict resolution curriculum in Oregon schools.

== Elections ==
Furse was first elected to Congress in 1992, defeating State Treasurer Tony Meeker, in a year where the number of women in the House grew from 28 to 47.

In 1994, Furse, called by one Northwest newspaper the "antithesis of Congress' traditional play-it-safe politicians", won reelection by 301 votes, defeating businessman Bill Witt during a year when the Republican Revolution produced a 54-seat gain for her opponent's party.

In 1996, Furse won 52% of the vote in a rematch with Witt. She declined to seek reelection in 1998, explaining that the job is "public service and not a career."

== Tenure in U.S. House of Representatives ==
In 1996, Furse and Congressman George Nethercutt (R-WA) co-founded the Congressional Diabetes Caucus and authored legislation which passed in 1997 to improve coverage of diabetes education and supplies in the Medicare program. The Congressional Diabetes Caucus has since grown to be the largest health-related Caucus in Congress.

She also was a key player in getting funding to extend the TriMet Westside MAX Light Rail project from its originally planned terminus on the Beaverton/Hillsboro border to downtown Hillsboro. TriMet subsequently named the plaza at Sunset Transit Center after her.

== Other activities ==
Furse and her partner John C. Platt owned Helvetia Vineyards and Winery in Helvetia, Oregon, where the couple planted grapes in 1982, and started their winery in 1992. As of 2007, the vineyard is home to both pinot noir and chardonnay grapes.

After retiring from Congress in 1999, she served as director of the Institute for Tribal Government at Portland State University. She also spearheaded the associated educational program, "Great Tribal Leaders of Modern Times" video interviews Her continued involvement in Native American affairs also brought her some attention during U.S. Senate campaigns for her high-profile endorsements of Senator Gordon Smith (R-OR). In a 2006 interview, Furse said her support in 2002 was because they "had a lot in common on tribal issues" and cited Smith's repeated votes against drilling in the Arctic National Wildlife Refuge, votes that defied pressure from Smith's fellow Republicans including Senator Stephens [sic]; she believed "you support those people who have stood up for issues that you care about" and that Smith is a "very moral person [who] if he doesn’t agree with you, he’ll tell you" something that Furse admired. Her continued support during the 2008 campaign included praise for Smith as "one of the first to stand up to George Bush and other Republicans to end this war".

In 2014, Furse stood for election to the Washington County Board of Commissioners in District 4, but lost the race to incumbent Commissioner Bob Terry (46.57%–53.10%). She ran with the endorsements of Congresswoman Suzanne Bonamici and former Governors Barbara Roberts and Ted Kulongoski.

Furse was a member of the ReFormers Caucus of Issue One.

== Death ==
Furse died on April 18, 2021, at age 84, at her farm near Hillsboro, of complications from a fall.

== See also ==
- Women in the United States House of Representatives

U.S. House of Representatives
Preceded by Les AuCoin	Member of the U.S. House of Representatives from Oregon's 1st congressional district 1993–1999	Succeeded by David Wu
