= John Samuel Bewley Monsell =

Irish Anglican clergyman and poet (1811–1875)

John Samuel Bewley Monsell (2 March 1811 – 9 April 1875) was an Irish Anglican clergyman and poet.

== Life ==
The son of Thomas Bewley Monsell, Archdeacon of Derry, he was born in St Columb's, Derry, and educated at Trinity College, Dublin, receiving a BA in 1832 (and an LL.D in 1856). He was ordained deacon in 1834, and priest in 1835. His sister was the noted botanical artist Diana Conyngham Ellis. He lived in Milford House, Co. Tipperary for a time.

He married Anne, daughter of Bolton Waller, of Shannon Grove and Castletown on 15 January 1835. Their eldest son Thomas Bewley Monsell, a lieutenant in the 19th Regiment, died in 1855 on the way to the Crimean War, aged 18. The date of death given by newspapers (16 February) predates the late-April fire and sinking of the SS Croesus offshore from the San Fruttuoso Abbey near Genoa. The eldest daughter Elizabeth Isabella died in Torquay at the age of 28 in 1861. Another daughter, Jane Diana, married the Rev. C. W. Furse in 1859. Through his son William Thomas Monsell, a magistrate and inspector of facturers, Monsell was grandfather to the artist Elinor Darwin (née Monsell).

His brother Charles, also a clergyman, married Harriet O'Brien, who refounded the Community of St John Baptist at Clewer near Windsor after her husband's death in Italy. Through Charles and Harriet, John Monsell became influenced by the Oxford Movement and an admirer of Edward Bouverie Pusey, and also became acquainted with William Ewart Gladstone, with whom he maintained a correspondence.

He was responsible for the building or rebuilding of three of his churches: Ramoan, at Ballycastle, County Antrim, St Jude, Englefield Green, during his incumbency at Egham, and St Nicolas' Church, Guildford. While inspecting the rebuilding of the latter, Monsell fell from a boulder, and subsequently died in 1875 from an infected wound.

== Service ==
- Curacy of Templemore (Diocese of Derry) 1834–1836
- Chaplain of Chapel of Ease (St Augustine’s) 1836–1838
- Chaplain of Magdalene College, Belfast 1843–1846
- Rector of Dunaghy 1846–1847
- Rector of Ramoan (Diocese of Connor) 1847–1853
- Chancellor of Connor 1847–1853
- Vicar of Egham, near Windsor 1853–1870
- Rector of St Nicolas' Church, Guildford and Chaplain to Queen Victoria 1870–1875.

== Published writings ==
Monsell was a prolific hymnist. He published eleven volumes of poems and about 300 hymns.

His books include: Hymns and Miscellaneous Poems (1837), Parish Musings: In verse (1850), Spiritual Songs for the Sundays and Holy Days Throughout the Year (1859), Hymns of Love and Praise for the Church's Year (1863), Our New Vicar (1867), Litany Hymns (1870).

His hymns include:

- "Fight the good fight with all thy might"
- "Mighty Father! Blessed Son"
- "On our way rejoicing as we homeward move"
- "Sing to the Lord a joyful song"
- "O Worship the Lord in the beauty of holiness!"
- "I hunger and I thirst"
