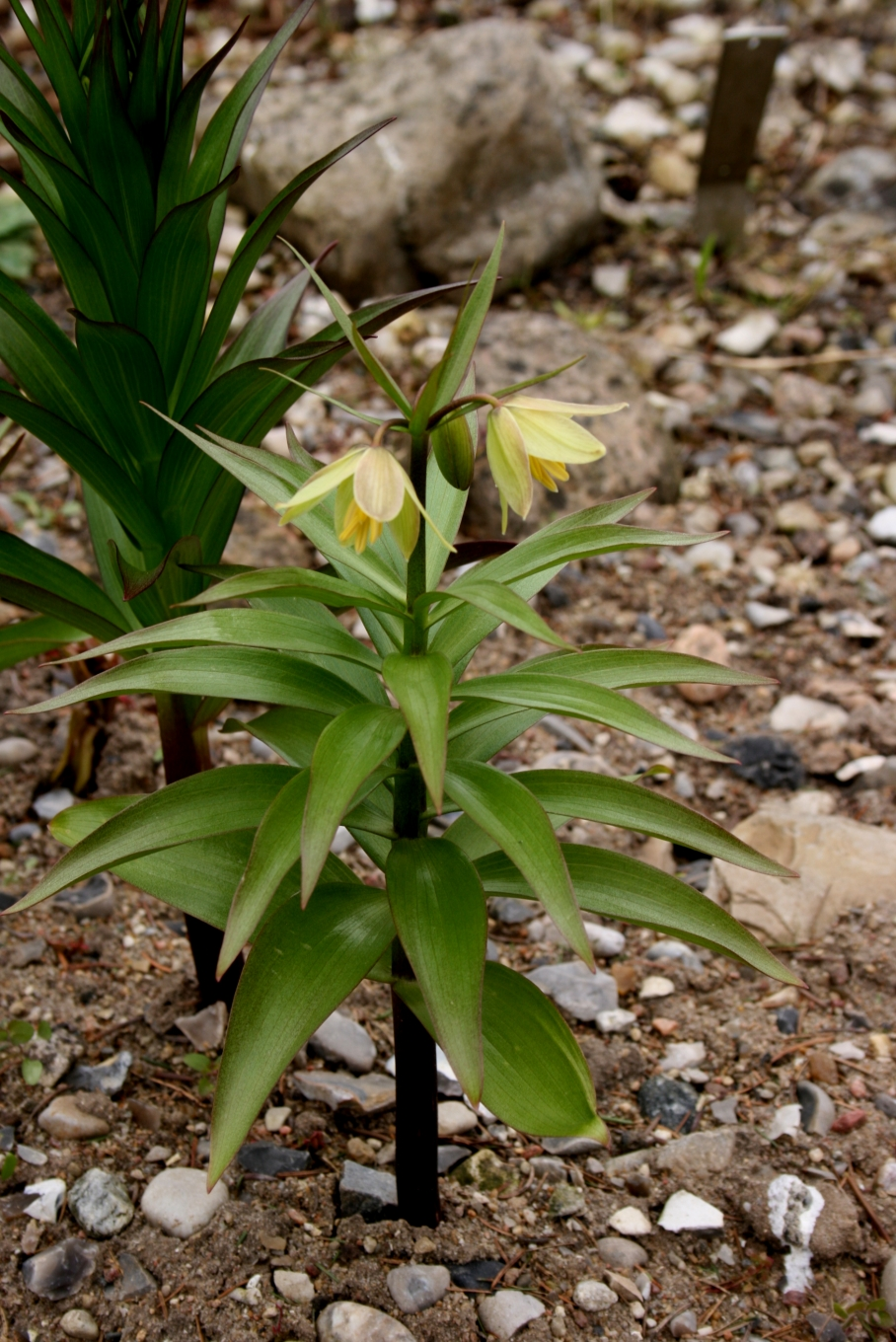

Scientific classification
- Kingdom: Plantae
- Clade: Tracheophytes
- Clade: Angiosperms
- Clade: Monocots
- Order: Liliales
- Family: Liliaceae
- Subfamily: Lilioideae
- Genus: Fritillaria
- Species: F. raddeana

Binomial name
- Fritillaria raddeana Regel

Synonyms
- Fritillaria askabadensis Micheli; Petilium raddeanum Vved. ex Pazij

= Fritillaria raddeana =

Species of flowering plant

Fritillaria raddeana is a perennial herbaceous bulbous plant, distributed in Iran, Turkmenistan and Kashmir. It is a species in the genus Fritillaria, in the lily family Liliaceae. It is placed in the subgenus Petilium. Resembling Fritillaria imperialis (crown imperial), but shorter, it is sometimes referred to as the dwarf crown imperial.

== Description ==
The inflorescence forms an umbel of 10–20 pendent bell-shaped flowers with six tepals that are yellowish to green. Nectaries 2–3 mm in diameter. Stem of about 2 1/2' feet (50–80 cm) in height. The umbel is topped with a pineapple-like tuft of narrow leaf-like bracts. On the stem are shiny, glaucous, lanceolate, pale green alternate leaves, up to 5 " in length. The chromosome number is 2n = 24

In common with closely related species including Fritillaria imperialis, the flowers of F. raddeana are often said to have a characteristically disagreeable scent.

== Taxonomy ==
In 1874 Baker had subdivided genus Fritillaria into ten subgenera. In subgenus Petilium he included a single species, F. imperialis. In 1887 Regel added a second species, F. raddeana. He named the species after Gustav Ferdinand Richard Radde (1831-1903).

== Distribution and habitat ==
F. raddeana is found in rocky areas in Iran, Turkmenistan and Kashmir at altitudes of 900–1800 meters, but is also seen in lowlands.

== Cultivation ==
Fritillaria raddeana is hardy to USDA zones 5–8., and blooms from April to May, in full sun to part shade.

== Bibliography ==
- Baker, J. G. (1874). "Revision of the Genera and Species of Tulipeae". Botanical Journal of the Linnean Society. xiv (76). F. assyriaca p. 265. doi:10.1111/j.1095-8339.1874.tb00314.x.
- Regel, Eduard August von (1887). "Fritillaria L. Sectio Petilium". Trudy Imperatorskago S.-Peterburgskago Botanicheskago Sada (Acta Horti Petropolitani) (in Latin). 10 (1): 365–366.
- Kiani, Mahmoud; Mohammadi, Shirin; Babaei, Alireza; Sefidkon, Fatemeh; Naghavi, Mohamad Reza; Ranjbar, Mojtaba; Razavi, Seyed Ali; Saeidi, Keramatollah; Jafari, Hadi; Asgari, Davoud; Potter, Daniel (September 2017). "Iran supports a great share of biodiversity and floristic endemism for Fritillaria spp. (Liliaceae): A Review". Plant Diversity. 39 (5): 245–262. doi:10.1016/j.pld.2017.09.002. PMC 6112302. PMID 30159518.
- Rix, E. M. (1977). "Fritillaria L. (Liliaceae) in Iran" (PDF). Iranian Journal of Botany. 1 (2): 75–95.
- TPL (2013). "The Plant List 1.1: Fritillaria raddeana Regel". Royal Botanic Gardens, Kew and Missouri Botanical Garden.
- WCSP. "Fritillaria raddeana Regel". World Checklist of Selected Plant Families (WCSP). Royal Botanic Gardens, Kew.
- "Fritillaria raddeana Regel". International Plant Names Index. 2005.
- "Fritillaria raddeana". Fritillaria species: A. Fritillaria Group, Alpine Garden Society.
- Roskov Y.; Kunze T.; Orrell T.; Abucay L.; Paglinawan L.; Culham A.; Bailly N.; Kirk P.; Bourgoin T.; Baillargeon G.; Decock W.; De Wever A.; Didžiulis V., eds. (2014). "Fritillaria raddeana Regel". Species 2000 & ITIS Catalogue of Life: 2014 Annual Checklist. Naturalis, Leiden, the Netherlands: ITIS, Royal Botanic Gardens, Kew.
- "Fritillaria raddeana". Plant Finder. Missouri Botanical Garden.
