= List of shipwrecks in April 1855 =

The list of shipwrecks in April 1855 includes ships sunk, wrecked or otherwise lost during April 1855.

== 1 April ==
List of shipwrecks: 1 April 1855
Ship	State	Description
Hedwig	Flag unknown	The ship was driven ashore on the coast of Sweden. She was refloated and taken in to "Hombock", Denmark.
HMS Imperieuse	Royal Navy	The Imperieuse-class frigate ran aground off the Reefness Lighthouse (Røsnæs lighthouse), in Kalundborg, Denmark. She was refloated the next day with assistance from HMS Euryalus (Royal Navy).
Marquis of Hastings	United Kingdom	The ship was wrecked on the Colorados, off the coast of Cuba. Her crew were rescued. She was on a voyage from British Honduras to Queenstown, County Cork.
Minx	United Kingdom	The schooner struck a sunken rock and foundered off the coast of Pembrokeshire. Her crew were rescued.
Oregon	United States	The steamship suffered a boiler explosion and sank in Lake Erie off Cleveland, Ohio with the loss of ten lives.
Union	United Kingdom	The schooner was driven ashore at Arklow, County Wicklow. She was refloated on 9 April and resumed her voyage.

== 2 April ==
List of shipwrecks: 2 April 1855
Ship	State	Description
United	(United Kingdom of Great Britain and Ireland) Jersey	The smack was in collision with Clarendon (United Kingdom) and foundered in the Bristol Channel with the loss of a crew member. She was on a voyage from Swansea, Glamorgan to Teignmouth, Devon.
Wave	(United Kingdom of Great Britain and Ireland) New South Wales	The ship was wrecked in Emu Bay.

== 4 April ==
List of shipwrecks: 4 April 1855
Ship	State	Description
Amelia and Mary	United Kingdom	The ship ran aground on the Goodwin Sands, Kent. She was on a voyage from Newcastle upon Tyne, Northumberland to Constantinople, Ottoman Empire. She was refloated the next day.
Flying Fish	(United Kingdom of Great Britain and Ireland) British Cape Colony	The schooner was wrecked in Robbe Bay. Her crew were rescued.

== 5 April ==
List of shipwrecks: 5 April 1855
Ship	State	Description
Carbon	United Kingdom	The steamship ran aground in the River Mersey. She was refloated the next day and sailed for Preston, Lancashire.
Chevy Chase	United Kingdom	The steamship ran aground at Molenhaven, South Holland, Netherlands.
Eliza	United Kingdom	The barque was driven ashore and wrecked in Laggan Bay. Her crew were rescued. She was on a voyage from Saint John, New Brunswick, British North America to the Clyde.
Java	United Kingdom	The schooner was driven ashore at Redcar, Yorkshire. She was refloated.
Star of the East	United Kingdom	The ship was wrecked at Raissard Head, New Zealand.
Westphalia	Stettin	The ship was driven ashore near Hirtshals, Denmark. She was on a voyage from Stettin to Newcastle upon Tyne, Northumberland, United Kingdom. She had broken up by 18 April.
Woodstock	(United Kingdom of Great Britain and Ireland) British North America	The barque was wrecked on the Kinguatel Reef. She was on a voyage from Manzanilla, Trinidad to Cork.

== 6 April ==
List of shipwrecks: 6 April 1855
Ship	State	Description
Daisy	United Kingdom	The ship was driven ashore on "Kandesterderne". She was on a voyage from Dundee, Forfarshire to Helsingør, Denmark. She subsequently broke up.
Daniel	United Kingdom	The steamship ran aground at South Shields, County Durham. She was on a voyage from South Shields to Great Yarmouth, Norfolk. She was refloated and put back to South Shields.
Grecian	United States	The ship caught fire and put in to "Lombeck", Netherlands East Indies. The fire was extinguished and she was taken in to Surabaya for repairs.
Jane Shirref	United Kingdom	The ship was driven ashore near Hirtshals, Denmark. She was on a voyage from Newcastle upon Tyne, Northumberland to Helsingør. She had broken up by 18 April.
Lovely Lass	United Kingdom	The ship ran aground on the Newcombe Sand, in the North Sea off the coast of Suffolk. She was on a voyage from Newcastle upon Tyne, Northumberland to Cork. She was refloated and resumed her voyage.

== 7 April ==
List of shipwrecks: 7 April 1855
Ship	State	Description
John Owen	United Kingdom	The ship ran aground at New Orleans, Louisiana, United States. She was on a voyage from Liverpool, Lancashire to New Orleans. She was refloated the next day and taken in to New Orleans.
Perseverance	(United Kingdom of Great Britain and Ireland) New South Wales	The brig sank at Dawes Point.
Simoda	United Kingdom	The ship ran aground at New Orleans. She was on a voyage from Liverpool to New Orleans. She was refloated the next day and taken in to New Orleans.
St. Clair	United Kingdom	The ship ran aground on the Sow Rocks. She was on a voyage from th Firth of Forth to the River Tyne.

== 8 April ==
List of shipwrecks: 8 April 1855
Ship	State	Description
Margaret Wood	United Kingdom	The sloop ran aground on the Longscar Rock. She was on a voyage from Cullen, Moray to Middlesbrough, Yorkshire. She was refloated.
North Carolina	United States	The steamship was in collision with the barque Robert (United Kingdom) and sank in the Irish Sea 30 nautical miles (56 km) west of the Tuskar Rock. Twenty-two of her 33 crew were rescued by Robert, three by Manhattan (United States) and the remainder by the steamship Arran (United Kingdom). North Carolina was on a voyage from Philadelphia, Pennsylvania to Liverpool, Lancashire, United Kingdom.
Prince Edward	United Kingdom	The brig ran aground on the Newcombe Sand, in the North Sea off the coast of Suffolk. She was on a voyage from London to South Shields, County Durham. She was refloated with the assistance of boats from Pakefield and taken in to Lowestoft.
Waters	United Kingdom	The brig ran aground off Kingsdown, Kent. She was on a voyage from Sunderland, County Durham to Portsmouth, Hampshire. She was refloated and resumed her voyage.

== 9 April ==
List of shipwrecks: 9 April 1855
Ship	State	Description
Isabella	United Kingdom	The schooner was driven ashore and wrecked in Roxston Bay. Her crew were rescued.
Pearl	United Kingdom	The ship ran aground on the Maplin Sand, in the North Sea off the coast of Essex. She was refloated with the assistance of some smacks and taken in to Maldon, Essex.
Rattlesnake	United Kingdom	The steamship ran onto a rock at Berbice, British Guiana.

== 10 April ==
List of shipwrecks: 10 April 1855
Ship	State	Description
Brailsford	United Kingdom	The schooner was wrecked on the West Hoyle Bank, in Liverpool Bay with the loss of all eight crew. She was on a voyage from Liverpool, Lancashire to Africa.

== 11 April ==
List of shipwrecks: 11 April 1855
Ship	State	Description
Clontarf	United Kingdom	The ship ran aground at Akyab, Burma. She was refloated the next day.
Mars	United Kingdom	The paddle steamer was driven ashore and wrecked near Largs, Ayrshire. All on board were rescued by the Coast Guard. She was on a voyage from Greenock, Renfrewshire to Millport, Ayrshire.

== 12 April ==
List of shipwrecks: 12 April 1855
Ship	State	Description
Danube	United Kingdom	The ship was driven ashore at Cape Janissary, Ottoman Empire.
Jacob	Prussia	The schooner was driven ashore on Skagen, Denmark. Her crew were rescued. She was on a voyage from Grangemouth, Stirlingshire, United Kingdom to Stettin. She had become a wreck by 16 April.
Selina	United Kingdom	The ship was driven ashore at Dragør, Denmark. She was on a voyage from Hartlepool, County Durham to Memel, Kingdom of Prussia. She was refloated on 14 April and taken in to Helsingør, Denmark.

== 13 April ==
List of shipwrecks: 13 April 1855
Ship	State	Description
Fortuna	Kingdom of Sardinia	The brig was in collision with RMS Arabia (United Kingdom) and foundered in the Atlantic Ocean off Cape St. Vincent, Portugal. Her crew were rescued by RMS Arabia. Fortuna was on a voyage from Gibraltar to Lisbon, Portugal.
Harebell	United Kingdom	The ship foundered in the Mediterranean Sea. Her crew were rescued by Rowena (United Kingdom). Harebell was on a voyage from Licata, Sicily to Liverpool, Lancashire.
Osprey	(United Kingdom of Great Britain and Ireland) Cape Colony	The ship was driven ashore and wrecked in St. Sebastian's Bay.
Plata	Brazil	The ship ran aground at the mouth of the Rio Grande.

== 14 April ==
List of shipwrecks: 14 April 1855
Ship	State	Description
Atkins	United Kingdom	The ship was driven ashore at Castle Point, Denmark. She was refloated the next day with the assistance of a steamship and put in to Helsingør.

== 15 April ==
List of shipwrecks: 15 April 1855
Ship	State	Description
Fly	United Kingdom	The ship collided with another vessel in the North Sea. Her crew were rescued the next day by George (United Kingdom). Fly was taken in tow on 17 April by the barque Rose ( (United Kingdom of Great Britain and Ireland) Guernsey). The tow was transferred to towed her in to Whitby, Yorkshire.

== 16 April ==
List of shipwrecks: 16 April 1855
Ship	State	Description
Austerlitz	French Navy	The Hercule-class ship of the line was driven ashore at South Foreland, Kent, United Kingdom. She was refloated the next day.
Sophia Augustine	United Kingdom	The ship departed from "Requijade" for Liverpool, Lancashire. No further trace, presumed foundered with the loss of all hands.

== 17 April ==
List of shipwrecks: 17 April 1855
Ship	State	Description
I. R. Folsom	United States	The ship struck the Hen and Chickens Rocks, off Lundy Island, Devon, United Kingdom and sank. Her crew were rescued. She was on a voyage from Cardiff, Glamorgan, United Kingdom to New York.
Marchiena	Netherlands	The ship ran aground and was wrecked near Hirtshals, Denmark. Her crew were rescued. She was on a voyage from Newcastle upon Tyne, Northumberland, United Kingdom to Stettin.

== 18 April ==
List of shipwrecks: 18 April 1855
Ship	State	Description
Dantzic	Danzig	The steamship ran aground and sank at Memel, Prussia with the loss of 91 of the 93 people on board. She was on a voyage from Stettin to Memel.
Triton	United Kingdom	The ship was lost near Bahia, Brazil. Her crew were rescued. She was on a voyage from Cardiff, Glamorgan to Bahia.
Warren Packet	United Kingdom	The ship ran aground off Alt Skagen, Denmark and was wrecked with the loss of all hands.

== 19 April ==
List of shipwrecks: 19 April 1855
Ship	State	Description
Attalante	Belgium	The ship ran aground on the Bal-van-Heist Bank. She was on a voyage from Samarang, Netherlands East Indies to Antwerp. She was refloated with assistance from the steamship Rubis (Belgium) and was taken in to Antwerp, where she again ran aground.
Flying Dragon	India	The schooner was destroyed by fire in Simon's Bay, Cape Colony with the loss of one life. She was on a voyage from Calcutta to Boston, Massachusetts, United States.

== 20 April ==
List of shipwrecks: 20 April 1855
Ship	State	Description
Liebe	Hamburg	The ship ran aground and was wrecked off the mouth of the Agger Canal. Her crew were rescued. She was on a voyage from Emden, Kingdom of Hanover to Nykøbing, Denmark.

== 21 April ==
List of shipwrecks: 21 April 1855
Ship	State	Description
Arrow	United Kingdom	The ship was wrecked at Sines, Portugal. Her crew were rescued.
Elizabeth	United Kingdom	The Yorkshire Billyboy sprang a leak and was beached at Middleton, County Durham. She was on a voyage from Whitby, Yorkshire to Newcastle upon Tyne, Northumberland. She was refloated and taken in to Hartlepool, County Durham.
Legère	France	The ship foundered off Belle Île, Morbihan with the loss of all hands. She was on a voyage from Saint-Martin-de-Ré, Charente-Inférieure to Morlaix, Finistère and Rouen, Seine-Inférieure.
Neptune	France	The ship was abandoned off "Cordovran". Her crew were rescued by Jenny (United Kingdom). Neptune was on a voyage from Swansea, Glamorgan, United Kingdom to Bordeaux, Gironde.
Palestine	United Kingdom	The ship foundered off Penzance, Cornwall.
Volonte de Dieu	France	The ship foundered off Belle Île. Her crew were rescued. She was on a voyage from the Île de Ré, Charente-Inférieure to Morlaix and Rouen.

== 22 April ==
List of shipwrecks: 22 April 1855
Ship	State	Description
Flora	United Kingdom	The ship ran aground off Margate, Kent. She was on a voyage from Hartlepool, County Durham to Margate.
Thomas	United Kingdom	The ship was driven ashore south of Drogheda, County Louth. Her crew were rescued. She was on a voyage from Workington, Cumberland to Drogheda. Thomas was refloated on 24 April.

== 23 April ==
List of shipwrecks: 23 April 1855
Ship	State	Description
Arcturus	United Kingdom	The ship ran aground on the Newcombe Sand, in the North Sea off the coast of Suffolk. She was on a voyage from Rouen, Seine-Inférieure, France to Königsberg, Prussia.
Brisbane	United Kingdom	The paddle steamer ran aground on the "Pedro de Sal", off the coast of South America. Her crew were rescued. She was on her maiden voyage, from the Clyde to Brisbane, South Australia. Brisbane had been refloated by 18 May and was taken in to Maranhão, Brazil. She was condemned.
Mars	United Kingdom	The steamship struck the quayside at Hebburn, County Durham and was severely damaged. She was on a voyage from the River Tyne to the Danube.
Mary and Elizabeth	United Kingdom	The ship was discovered derelict in the English Channel. She was towed in to Poole, Dorset. She had been on a voyage from Southampton to Bournemouth, Hampshire.
Nancy	United Kingdom	The ship ran aground off Arthurstown, County Waterford. She was refloated.
William Knox	United States	The steamboat was destroyed by fire in the Ohio River downstream of Louisville, Kentucky. All on board were rescued. She was on a voyage from St. Louis, Missouri to Cincinnati, Ohio.

== 24 April ==
List of shipwrecks: 24 April 1855
Ship	State	Description
Glendower	United Kingdom	The ship ran aground at Swansea, Glamorgan. She was on a voyage from Swansea to Liverpool, Lancashire.

== 25 April ==
List of shipwrecks: 25 April 1855
Ship	State	Description
Aberdeenshire	United Kingdom	The brig ran aground off Scharhörn. She was on a voyage from Hartlepool, County Durham to Hamburg. She was refloated and taken in to Cuxhaven.
Anna Hincks	United States	The ship ran aground in the Rio Grande do Sul. She was bound to Cork, United Kingdom. She was refloated.
Katherine	United Kingdom	The sloop capsized in Loch Sweyn with the loss of two of her crew. She was on a voyage from Loch Sweyn to Poltalloch, Argyllshire. She was righted on 30 April and taken in to Crinan, Argyllshire.

== 26 April ==
List of shipwrecks: 26 April 1855
Ship	State	Description
Amelia and Mary	United Kingdom	The brig ran aground on the Goodwin Sands, Kent. She was on a voyage from South Shields, County Durham to Constantinople, Ottoman Empire. She was refloated and taken in to The Downs.
Elizabeth Johanna	United Kingdom	The ship ran aground on the Hastings Shoal. She was on a voyage from Rangoon, Burma to a British port. She was refloated the next day and resumed her voyage.
Fatel Rozack	India	The ship was sighted in the Indian Ocean whilst on a voyage from Calcutta to London. No further trace, presumed foundered with the loss of all hands.
Joseph Pieters	Belgium	The schooner ran aground on the Goodwin Sands. She was on a voyage from Antwerp to Liverpool, Lancashire, United Kingdom. She was refloated and resumed her voyage.
Rachel	United Kingdom	The brig foundered in the North Sea 18 nautical miles (33 km) east south east of Whitby, Yorkshire. Her nine crew survived. She was on a voyage from South Shields, County Durham to Gothenburg, Sweden.
Santissima	Spain	The ship was driven ashore and wrecked at "Maydquaria", Bahamas. She was on a voyage from Trinidad to St. Jago de Cuba, Cuba, Mallorca and Marseille, Bouches-du-Rhône.

== 27 April ==
List of shipwrecks: 27 April 1855
Ship	State	Description
Patriot	Bremen	The ship foundered in the Atlantic Ocean with the loss of a crew member. She was on a voyage from Bremen to Havana, Cuba.

== 28 April ==
List of shipwrecks: 28 April 1855
Ship	State	Description
Aventure	French Navy	The Aventure-class corvette was wrecked on the Isle of Rines, New Caledonia.
Charlotte	United Kingdom	The ship was driven ashore in a capsized condition near Cape Spartel, Morocco.
Croesus	United Kingdom	The steamship caught fire and was beached at Portofino, Grand Duchy of Tuscany, where she was burnt out with the loss of 68 lives. Two rescuers were drowned.
Uncompleted vessel	(United Kingdom of Great Britain and Ireland) British North America	The 1,000-ton ship was destroyed by fire at Saint John, New Brunswick whilst under construction.

== 29 April ==
List of shipwrecks: 29 April 1855
Ship	State	Description
Iowa	United Kingdom	The ship departed for Melbourne, Victoria. No further trace, presumed foundered with the loss of 121 people on board.

== 30 April ==
List of shipwrecks: 30 April 1855
Ship	State	Description
Despatch	United Kingdom	The ferry struck pilings at Aust, Gloucestershire and sank with the loss of seven lives.
Kate Evelyn	United Kingdom	The ship was driven ashore in the Dardanelles.

== Unknown date ==
List of shipwrecks: Unknown date in April 1855
Ship	State	Description
Active	(United Kingdom of Great Britain and Ireland) British North America	The ship was abandoned in the Atlantic Ocean before 8 April.
Braga	United Kingdom	The ship was driven ashore at the mouth of the Danube. She was on a voyage from Lübeck to Galaţi, Ottoman Empire.
Golden Age	United Kingdom	The clipper was lost in Panama Bay in late April. All on board were rescued by the steamship John L. Stephens (United States). Golden Age was on a voyage from Liverpool, Lancashire to Australia.
Infanta	(United Kingdom of Great Britain and Ireland) British North America	The ship was abandoned in the Atlantic Ocean before 30 October.
Irwell	United Kingdom	The ship was damaged by fire at Hellevoetsluis, Zeeland, Netherlands.
Robert Lowe	United Kingdom	The ship ran aground in the Dardanelles before 26 April.
Shamrock	United Kingdom	The ship foundered in the Pacific Ocean 600 nautical miles (1,100 km) off Caldera, Chile before 28 April. Her crew survived. She was on a voyage from Callao, Peru to Liverpool.
Waterwitch	United Kingdom	The ship was driven ashore at Cape Pamona, Greece before 25 April. She was refloated and taken in to Salonica.
Wave	(United Kingdom of Great Britain and Ireland) New Zealand	The cutter was wrecked at the entrance to the Ahuriri Harbour in late April through negligence of the crew.
