= Charles Furse (priest) =

English cleric (1821–1900)

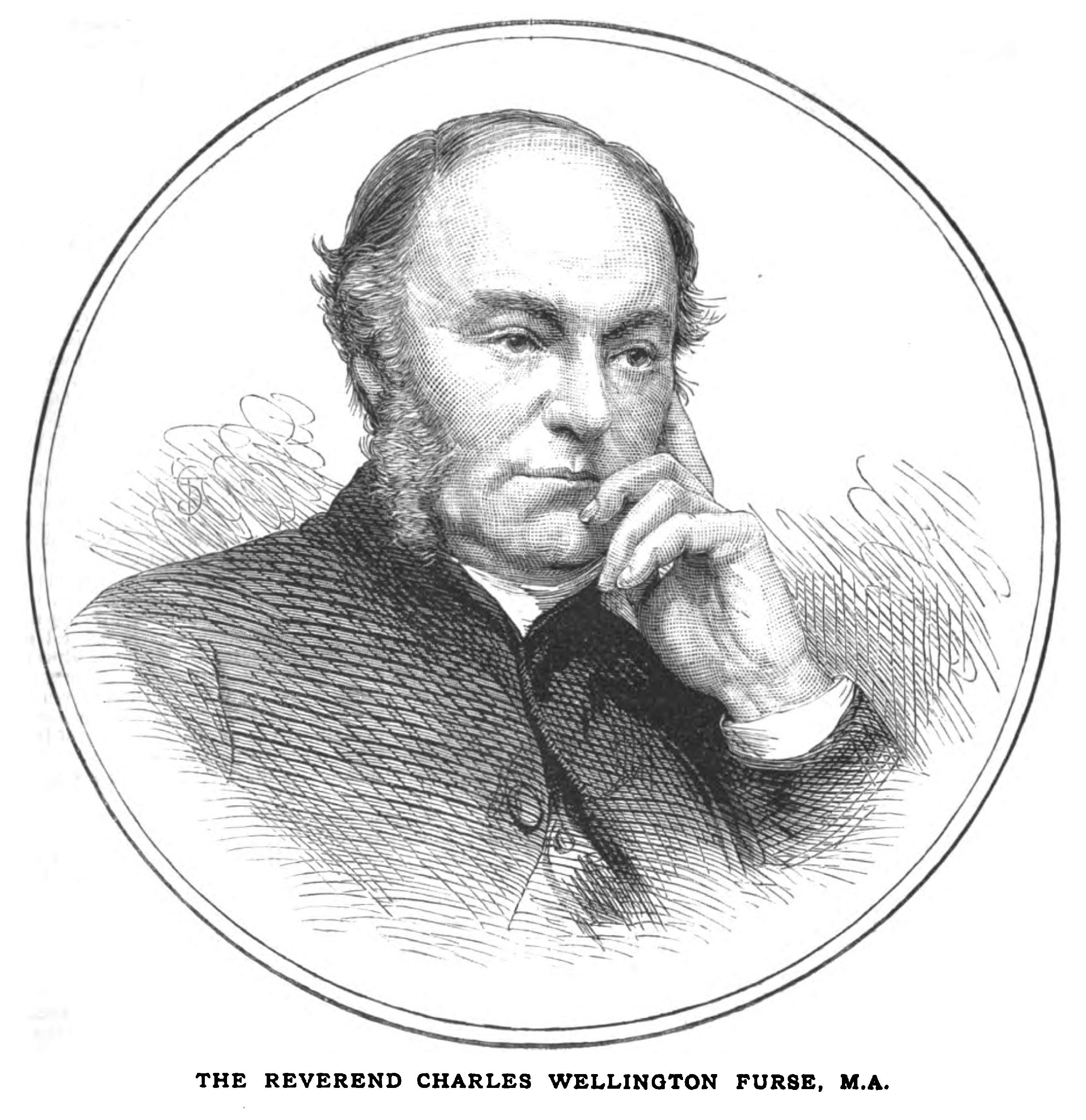
Charles Wellington Furse

Charles Wellington Furse, MA, JP (born Johnson; 16 April 1821 – 2 August 1900) was Archdeacon of Westminster from 1894 until his death.

Furse was the third son of Charles Wellington Johnson, of Great Torrington, Devon, and his wife Theresa Furze. In 1854 he changed his surname from Johnson to Furse in order to inherit from his maternal uncle John Furze (Furse). He was educated at Eton and Balliol College, Oxford. He was ordained in 1848. After curacies at St Andrew the Apostle, Clewer and Christ Church, Albany Street he was Vicar of Staines. He was then Principal of Cuddesdon Theological College and concurrently Chaplain to the Bishop of Oxford. He was the incumbent at St John's, Smith Square, Westminster from 1883 until his appointment as Archdeacon of Westminster.

== Marriage and issue ==
On 24 February 1859, Furse married Jane Diana Monsell, second daughter of John Samuel Bewley Monsell, vicar of Egham. They had ten children:

- John Henry Monsell Furse (6 March 1860 – 5 April 1950), sculptor
- Charles Cyril Furse (19 June 1861 – 21 March 1862)
- Elizabeth Diana Furse (1862–1939), married John Primatt Maud, Bishop of Kensington
- Mary Theresa Furse (1863–1952), married Charles Abraham, Bishop of Derby
- Lt.-Gen. Sir William Thomas Furse (1865–1953),
- Charles Wellington Furse (1868–1904), painter
- Rt. Rev. Michael Bolton Furse (1870–1955), Bishop of Pretoria and Bishop of St. Albans
- Margaret Furse
- Edith Furse (1874–1960), married Cecil Lubbock, Deputy Governor of the Bank of England
- John Monsell Furse (1877–1888)

Jane died in March 1877, and on 7 January 1880 Furse married Gertrude Louisa Barnett, daughter of Henry Barnett MP, and had two more children:

- Emily Katharine Furse (21 February 1881 – 8 July 1911)
- Herbert Reynolds Furse (31 January 1887 – 1956)

Church of England titles
Preceded by Frederick Farrar	Archdeacon of Westminster; 1894–1900	Succeeded by Basil Wilberforce
